= List of megalopolises =

This is a list of megalopolises grouped by geographical region and country in 61 countries.

Megalopolises of the world

== Africa ==
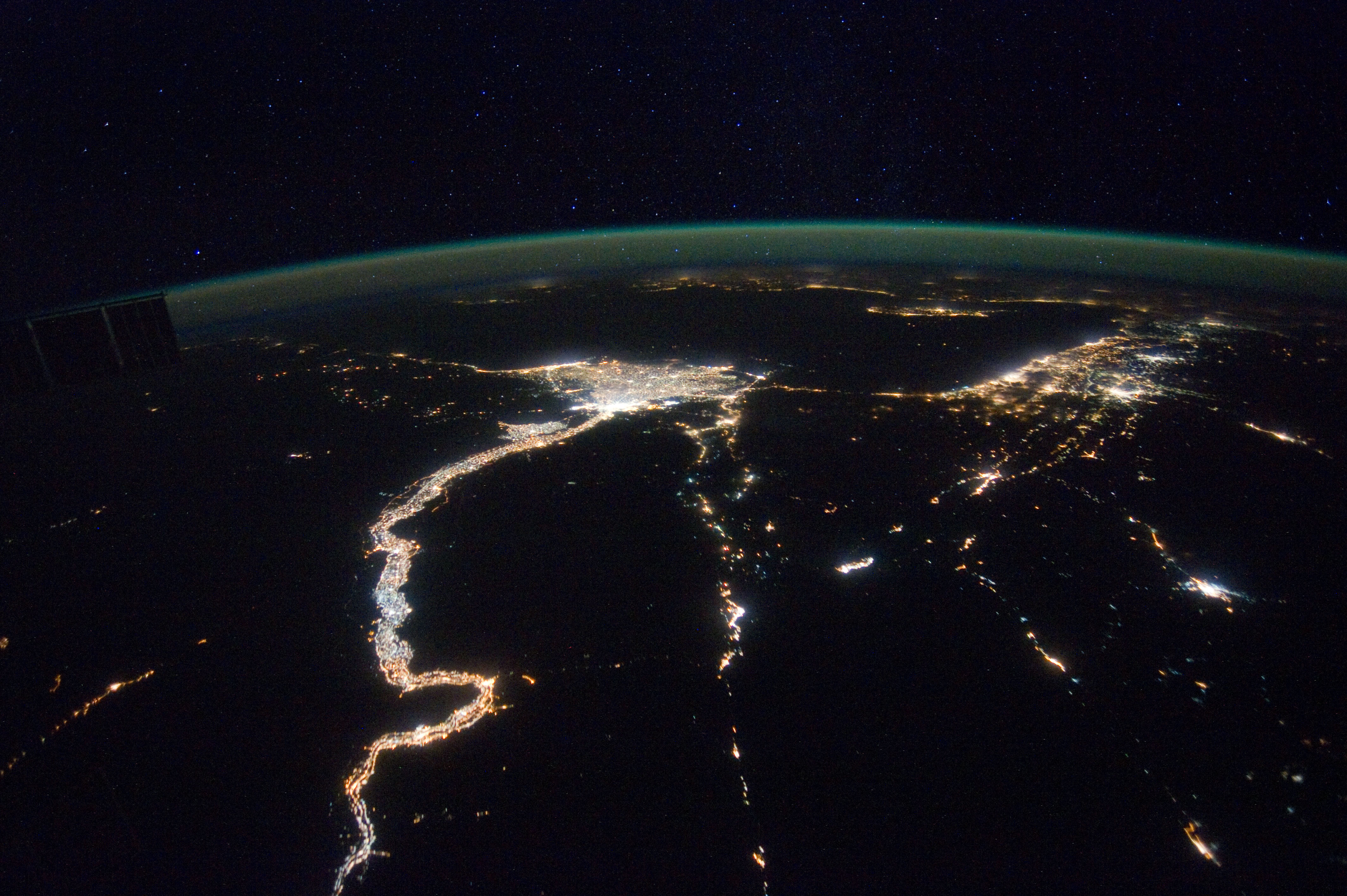
Nile Delta and Nile River at night from space

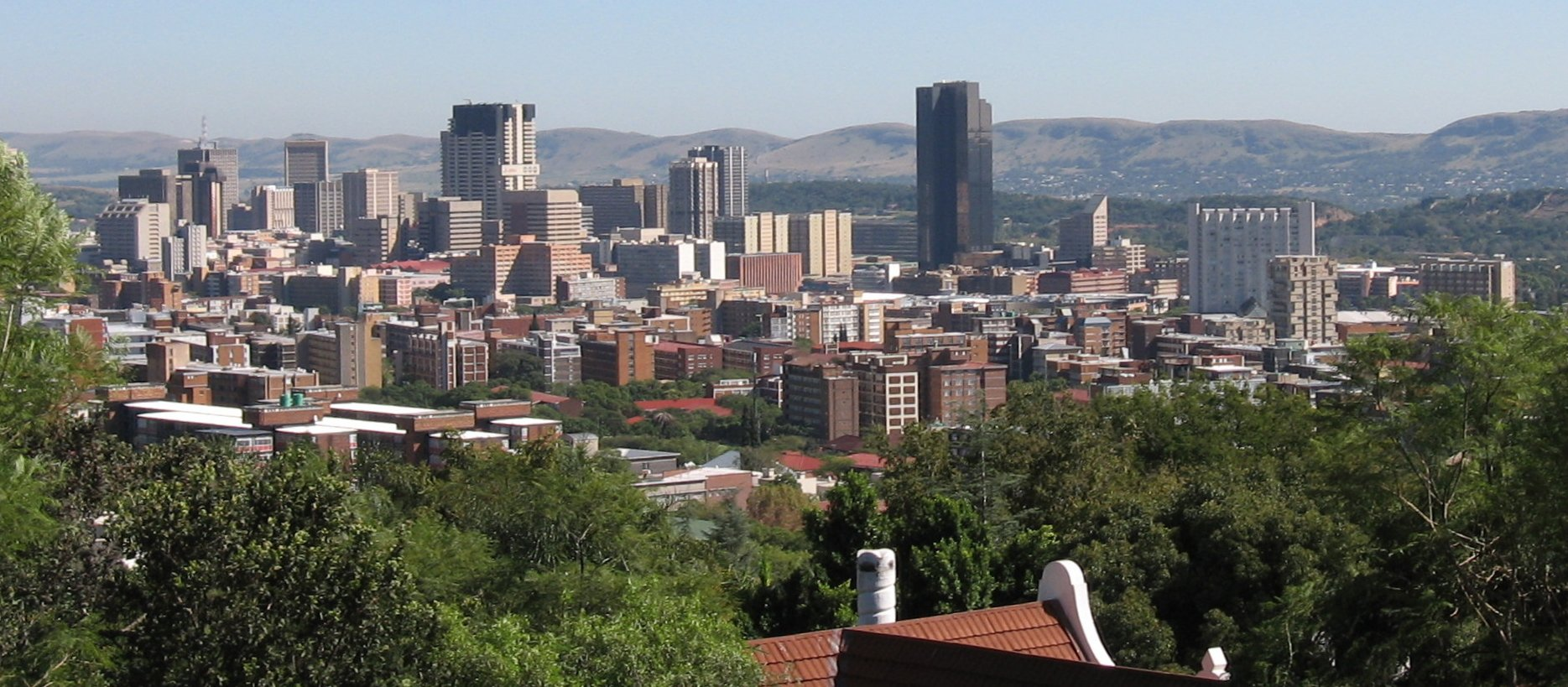
Pretoria, South Africa

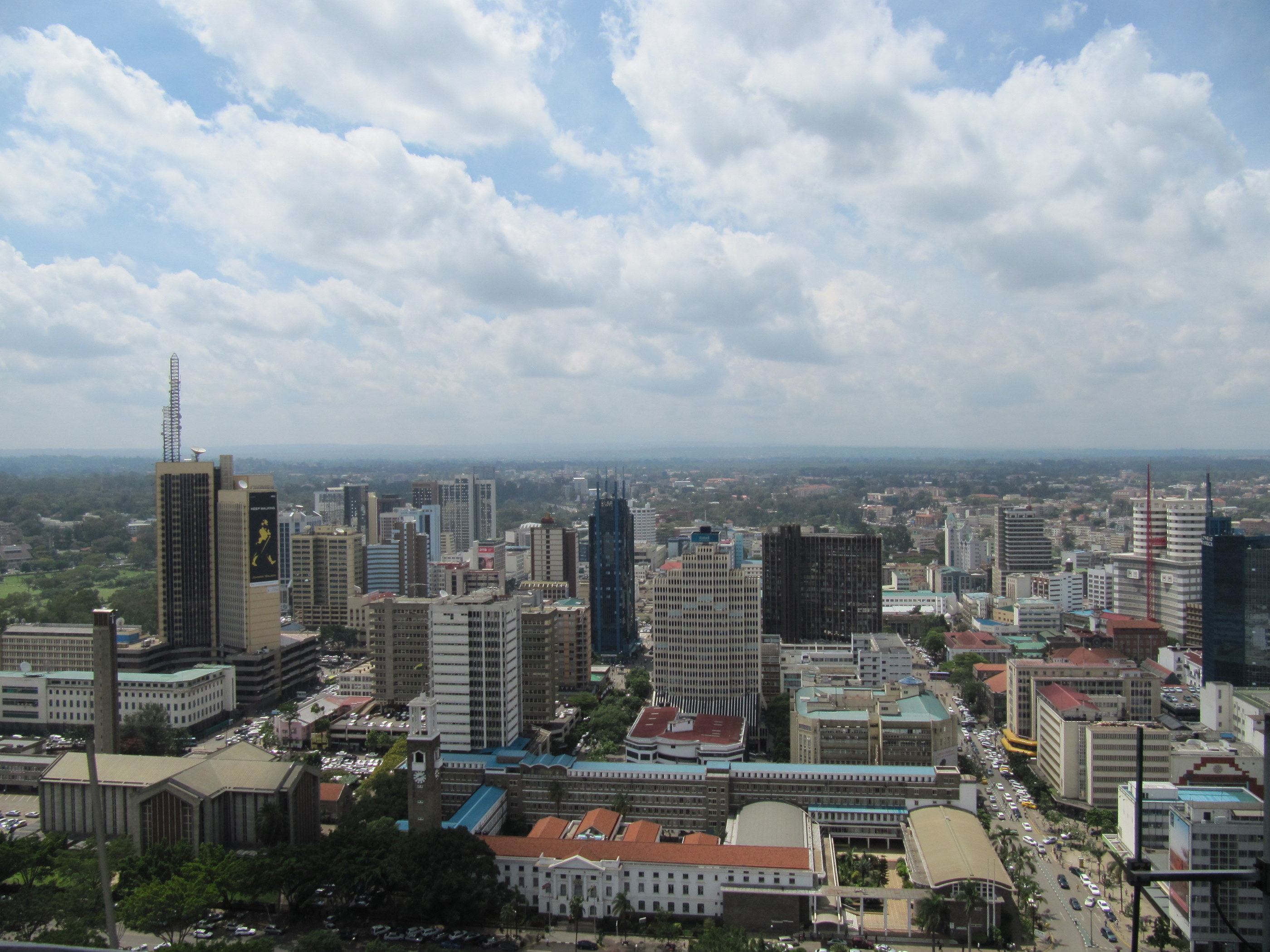
Nairobi, Kenya

Lagos, Nigeria

Country	Megalopolis	Major cities and areas	Population estimate
Egypt	Greater Cairo	The Governorates of Cairo, Giza and Qalyubiyya	22,183,000
Egypt	Nile Delta	Governorates of Alexandria, Beheira, Kafr el-Sheikh, Gharbia, Monufia, Qalyubiyya, Dakahlia, Damietta, Al Sharqia, and Port Said	50,322,424
Kenya	Nairobi Metropolitan Region	The counties of Kajiado, Kiambu, Nairobi, Machakos and Murang'a	10,411,220
Morocco	El Jadida-Casablanca-Rabat-Salé-Kenitra	El Jadida-Casablanca-Rabat-Salé-Kenitra	11,000,000
South Africa	Gauteng Province	The cities of Pretoria, Witwatersrand and Vereeniging includes the urbanised portion of Pretoria, Centurion, Midrand, Johannesburg and the Vaal Triangle	15,810,400
Benin	Abidjan–Lagos Corridor	Abomey-Calavi, Cotonou, Porto-Novo	42,436,069
Ghana	Abidjan–Lagos Corridor	Accra, Cape Coast, Sekondi-Takoradi	42,436,069
Côte d'Ivoire	Abidjan–Lagos Corridor	Abidjan	42,436,069
Nigeria	Abidjan–Lagos Corridor	Lagos	42,436,069
Togo	Abidjan–Lagos Corridor	Lomé	42,436,069

== Asia ==
=== East Asia ===
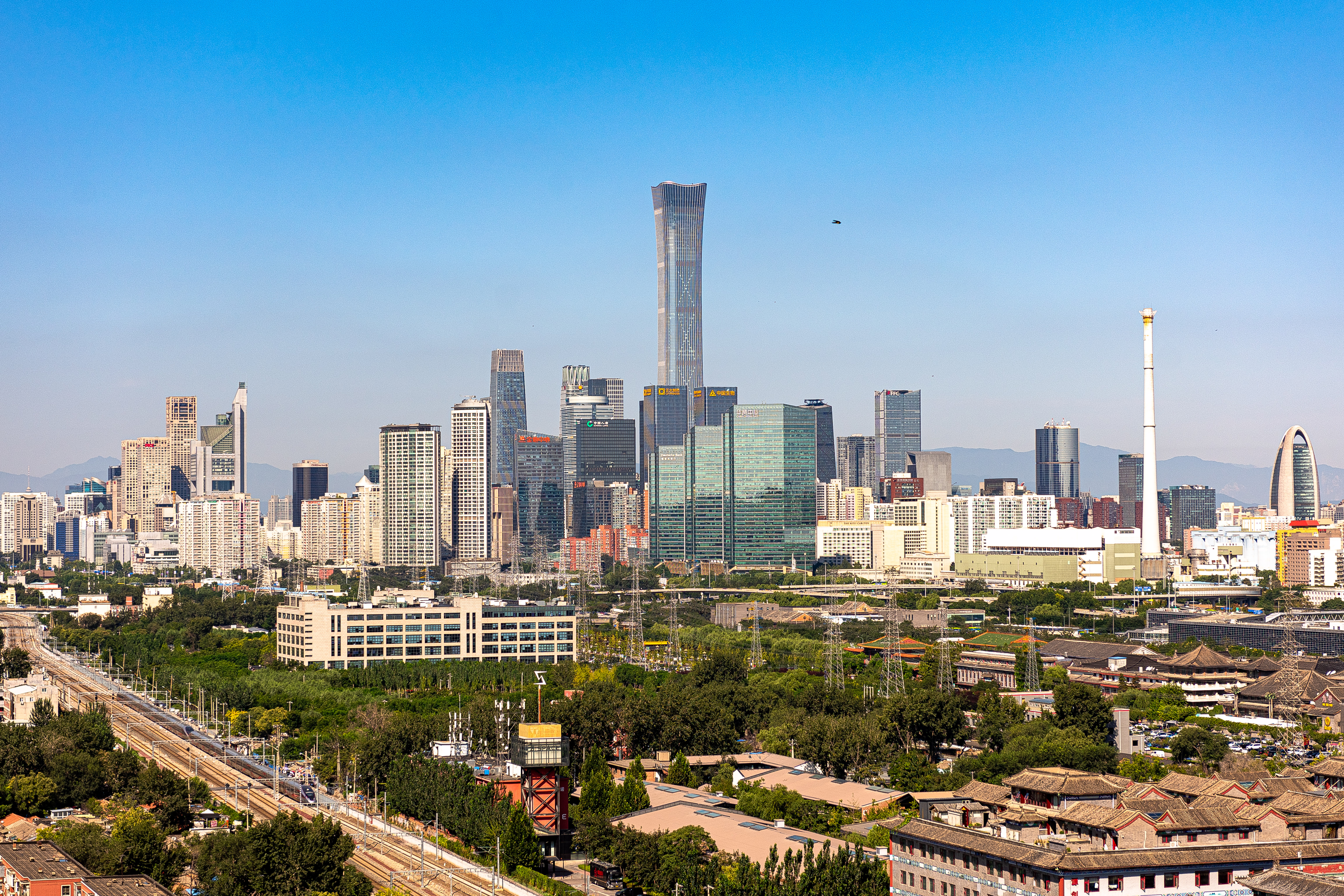
Beijing, China

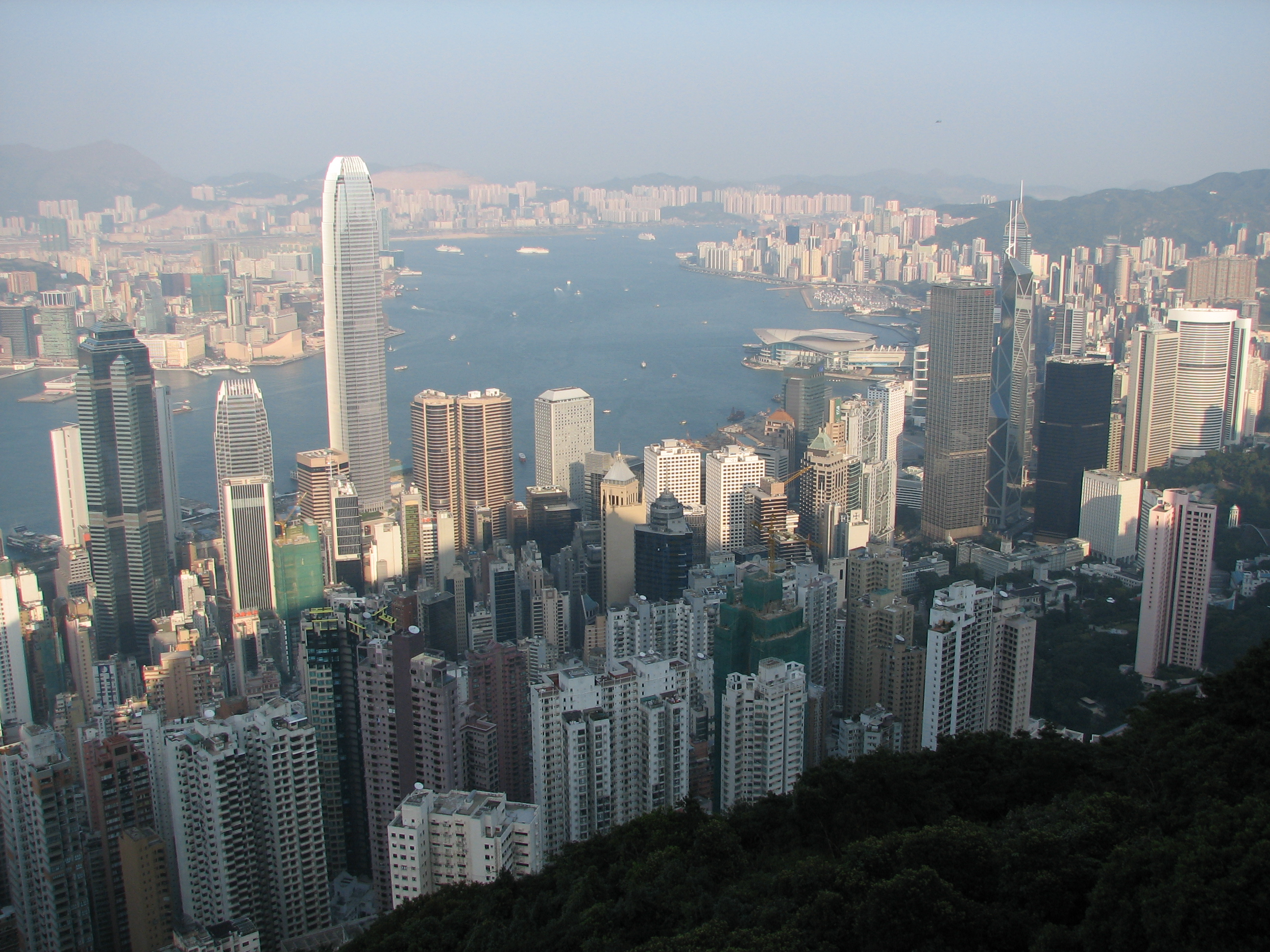
Hong Kong

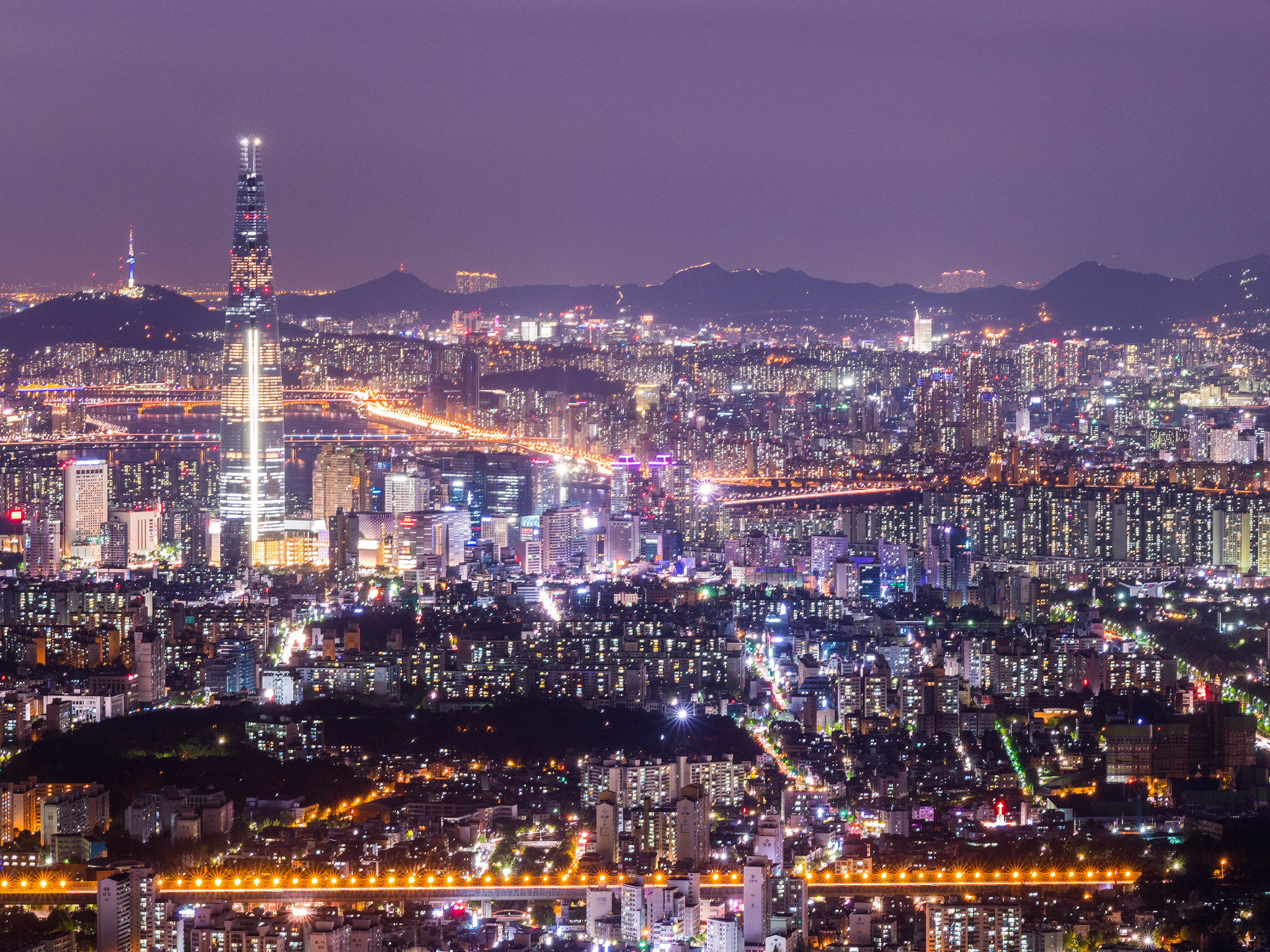
Seoul, South Korea

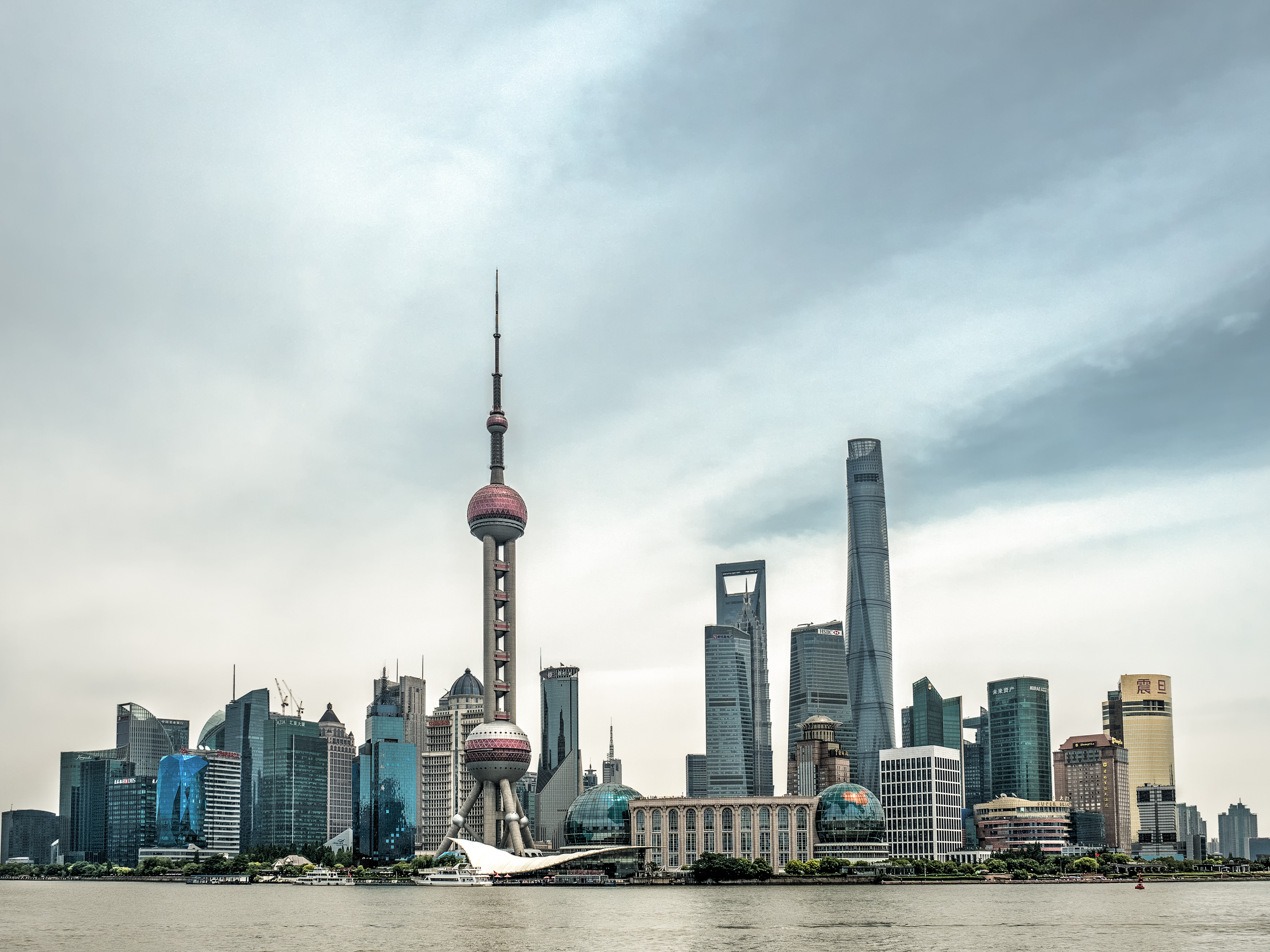
Shanghai, China

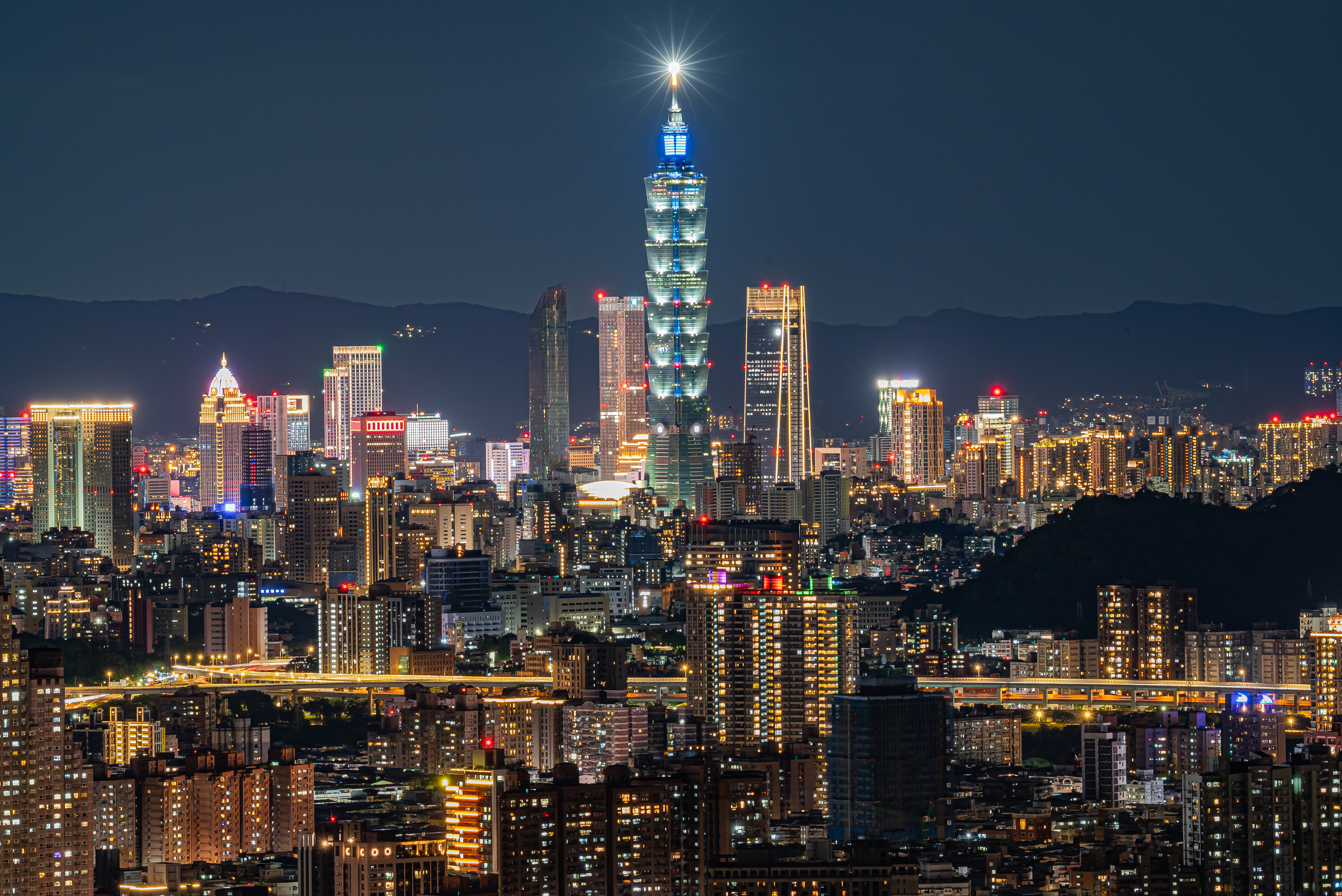
Taipei, Taiwan

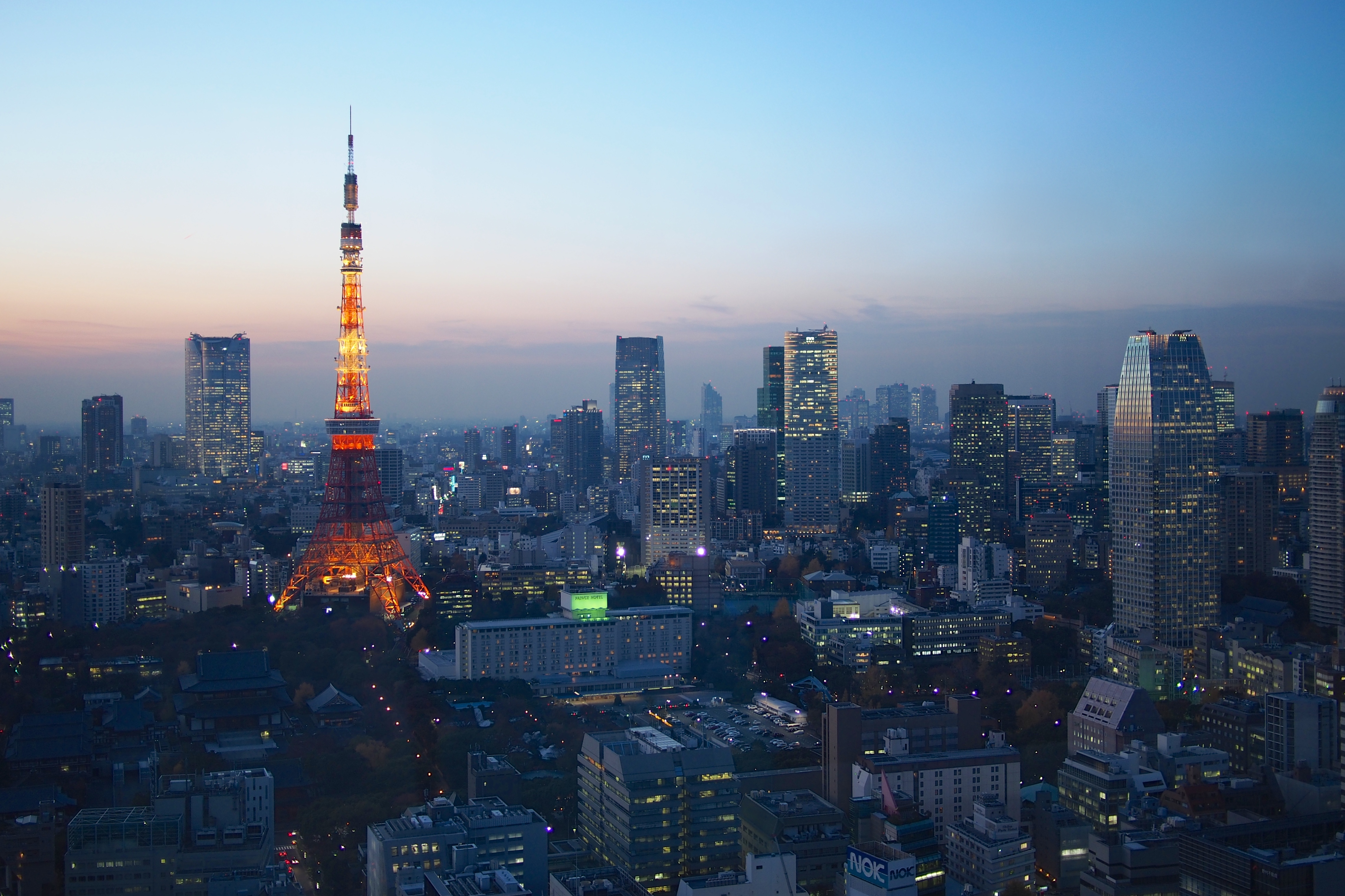
Tokyo, Japan
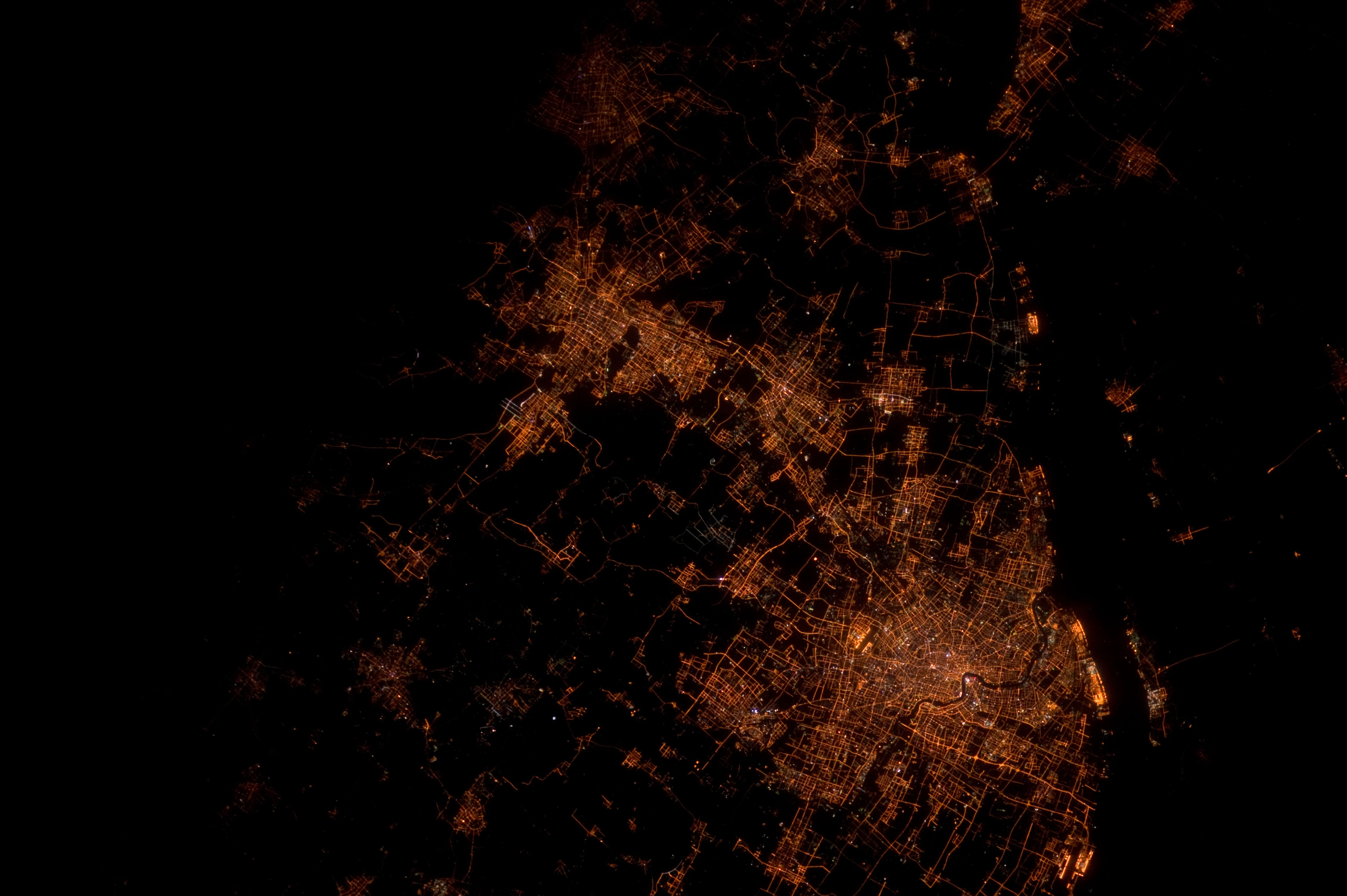
Yangtze Delta

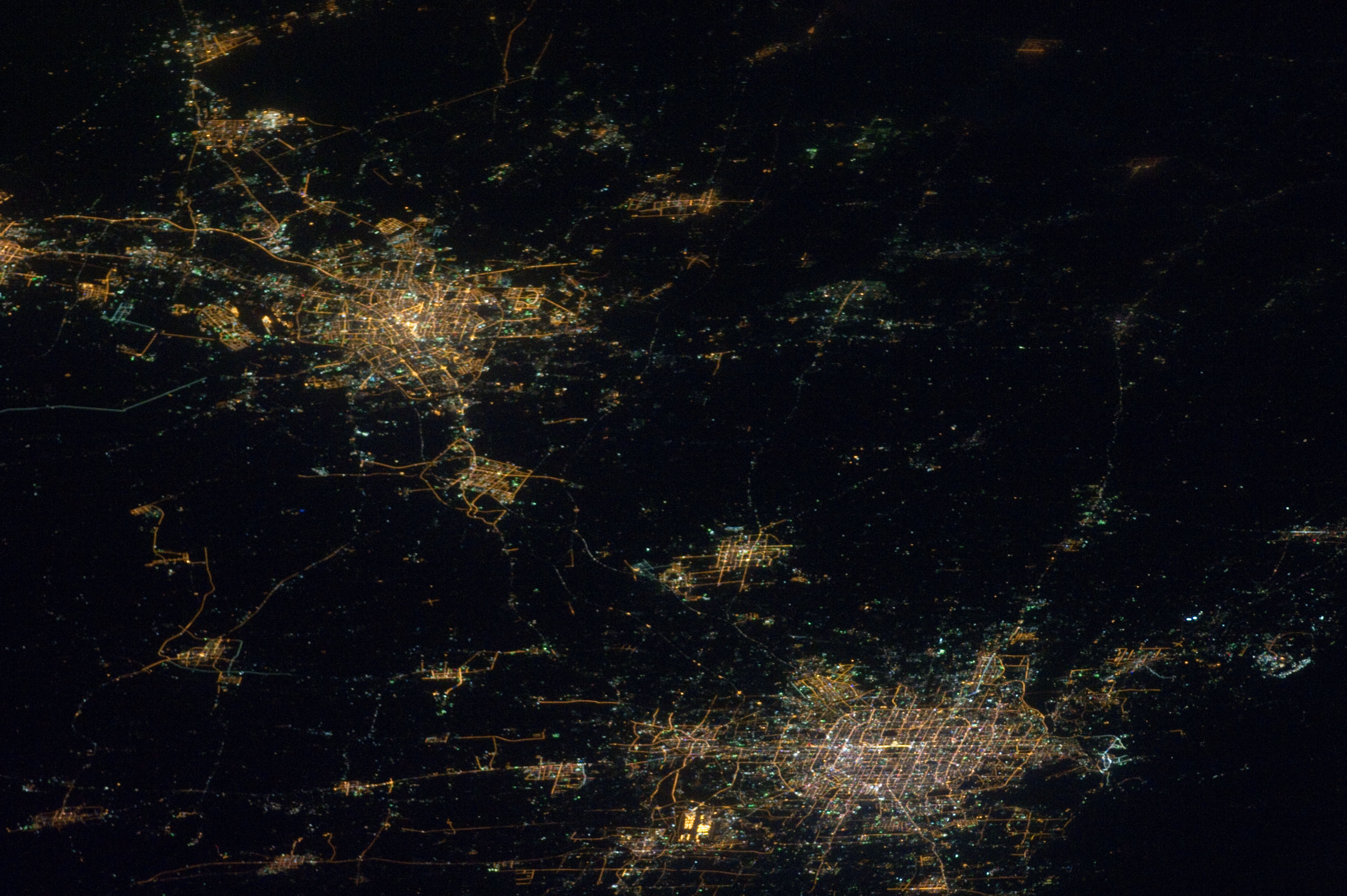
The Jing-Jin-Ji Metropolitan Region is the central part of the Bohai Economic Rim

Taiheiyō Belt

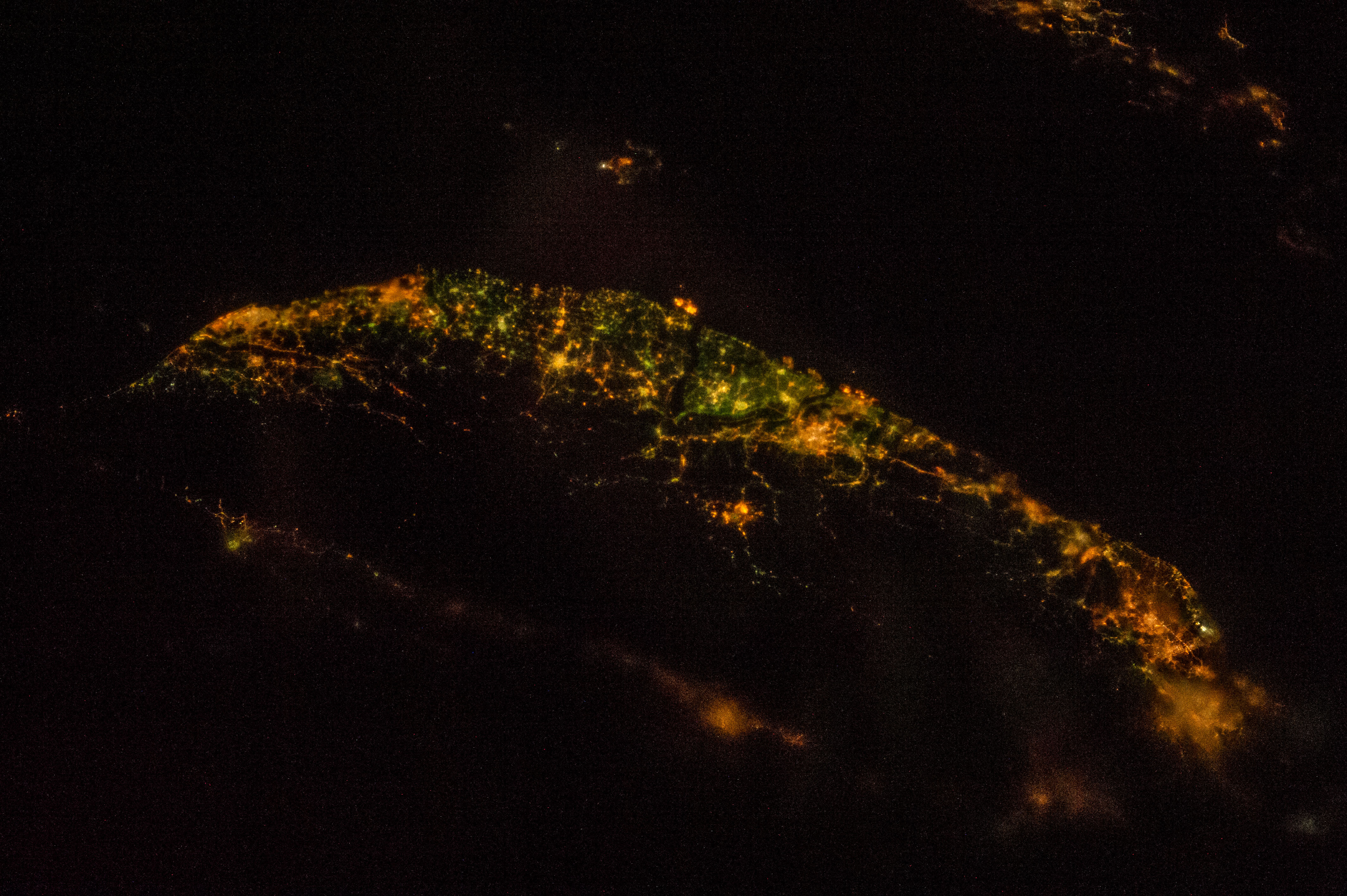
Satellite view of western Taiwan.

Country	Megalopolis	Major cities and areas	Population estimate
China	Further information: Megalopolises in China		
Japan	Greater Tokyo Area	Kantō region, broadly including Tokyo and Yokohama	38,000,000
Japan	Keihanshin	Kansai region, includes Osaka, Kyoto, Kobe	19,000,000
Japan	Taiheiyō Belt (includes both the Greater Tokyo Area and Keihanshin megapoles)	Ibaraki, Saitama, Chiba, Tokyo, Kanagawa, Shizuoka, Aichi, Gifu, Mie, Kyoto, Osaka, Hyōgo, Wakayama, Okayama, Hiroshima, Yamaguchi, Fukuoka, and Ōita	81,000,000
South Korea	Greater Busan Area	Busan, Ulsan, Changwon, Gimhae, Yangsan, Jinju	13,000,000
South Korea	Seoul National Capital Area	Seoul, Incheon, Suwon, Goyang, Yongin, Seongnam, and the rest of Gyeonggi Province	26,000,000
Taiwan	West Coast of Taiwan	Taipei, New Taipei City, Keelung, Taoyuan, Hsinchu, Taichung, Changhua, Chiayi, Tainan, and Kaohsiung	18,000,000

=== Southeast Asia ===
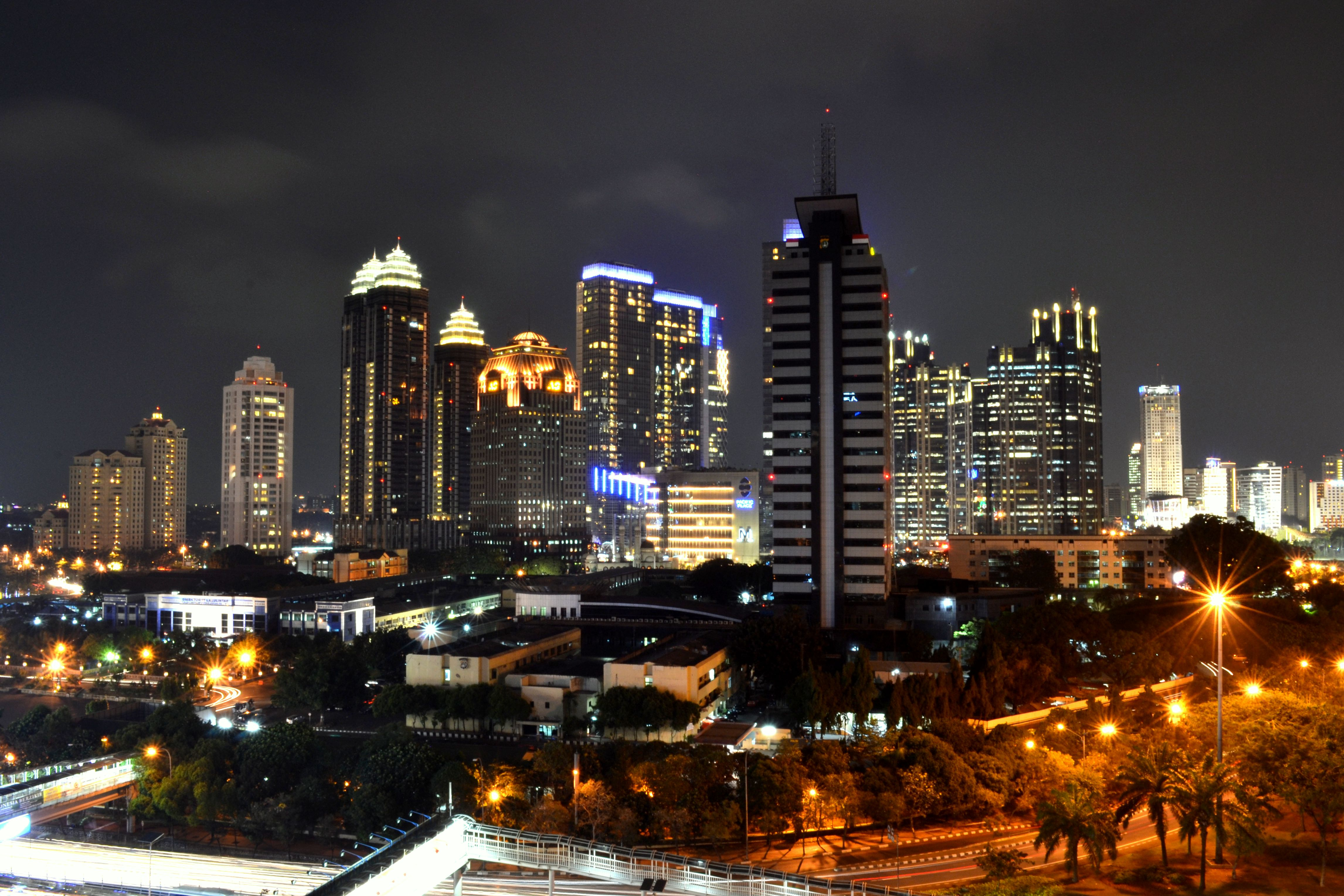
Jakarta, Indonesia

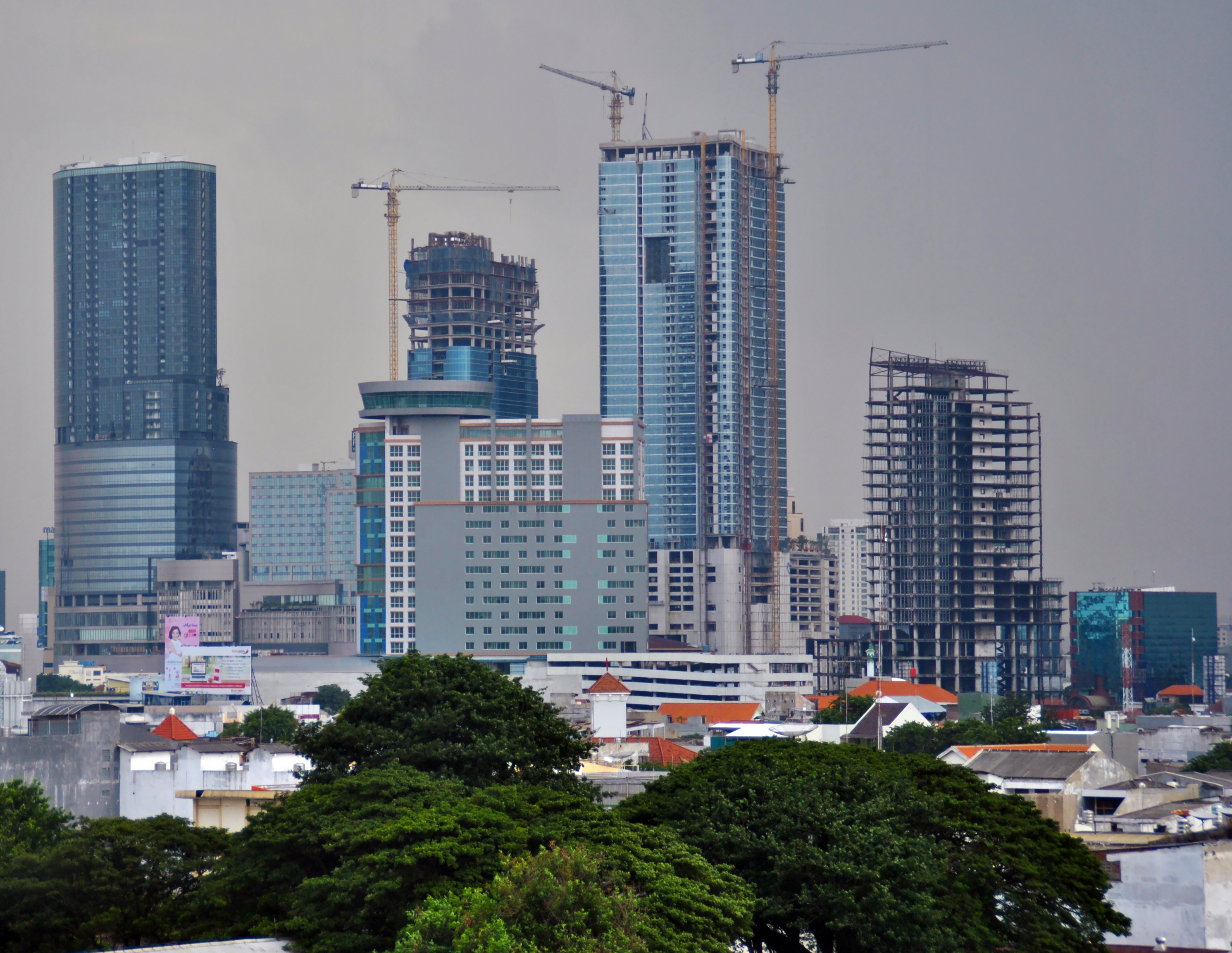
Surabaya, Indonesia

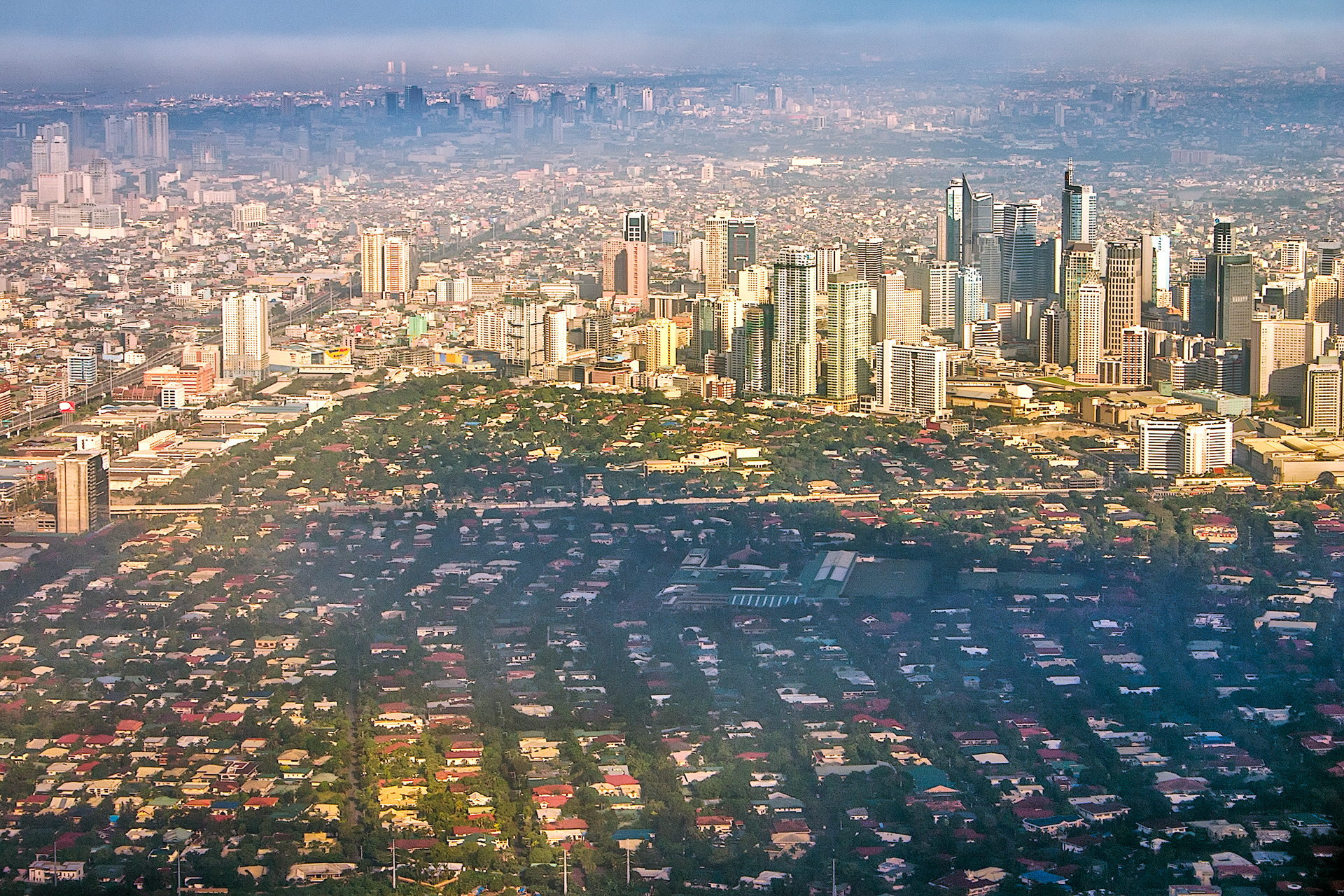
Mega Manila

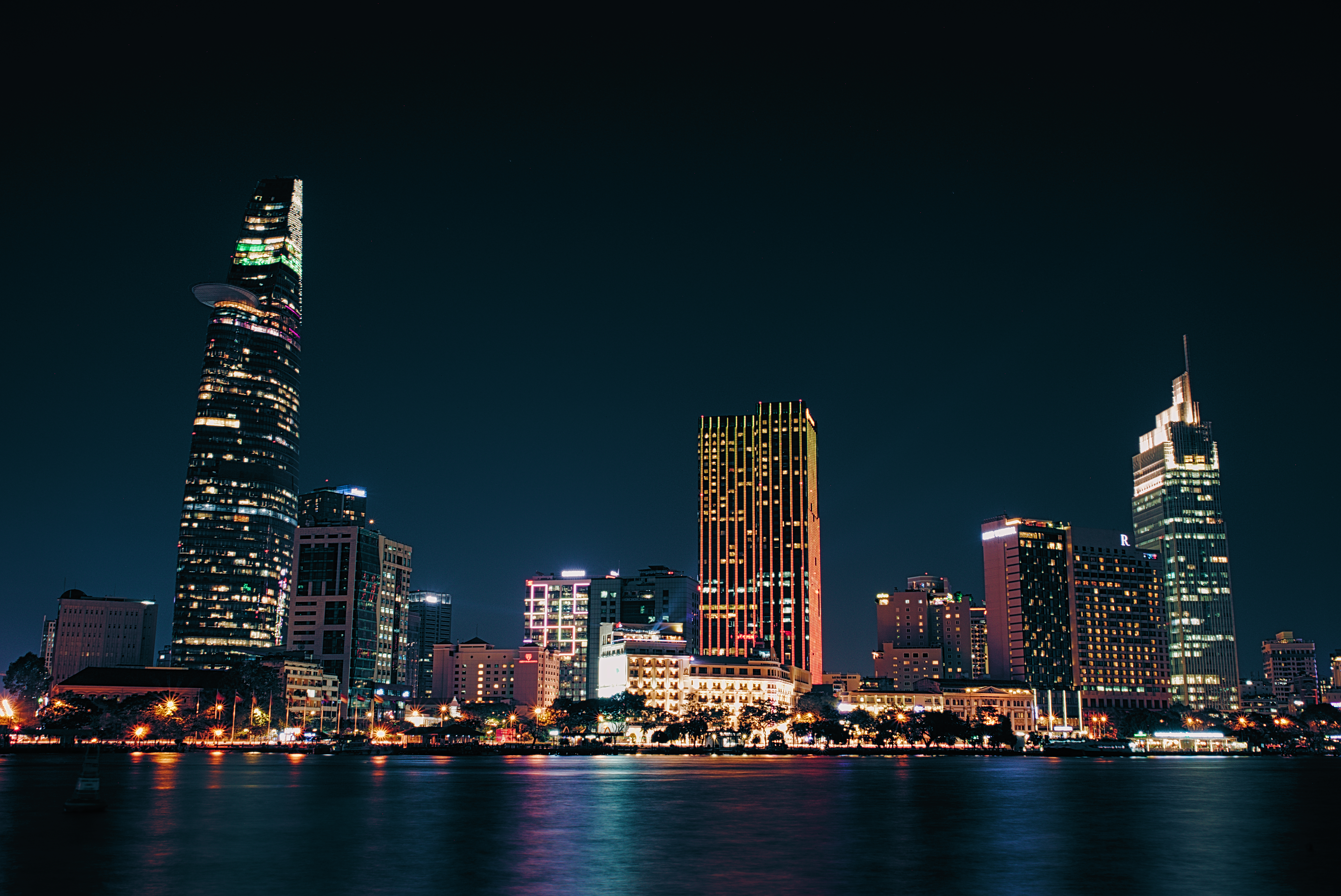
Ho Chi Minh City, Vietnam

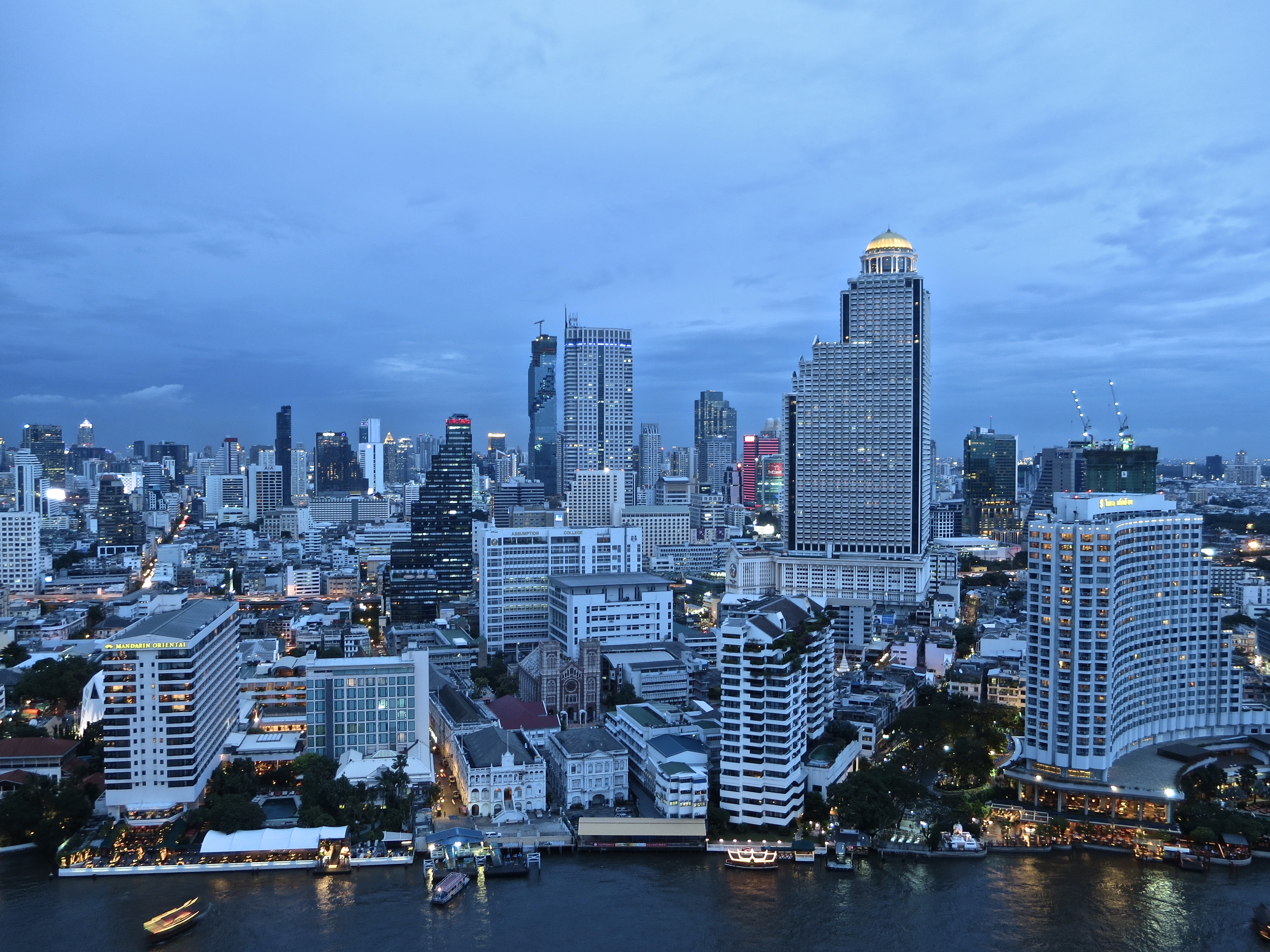
Bangkok, Thailand

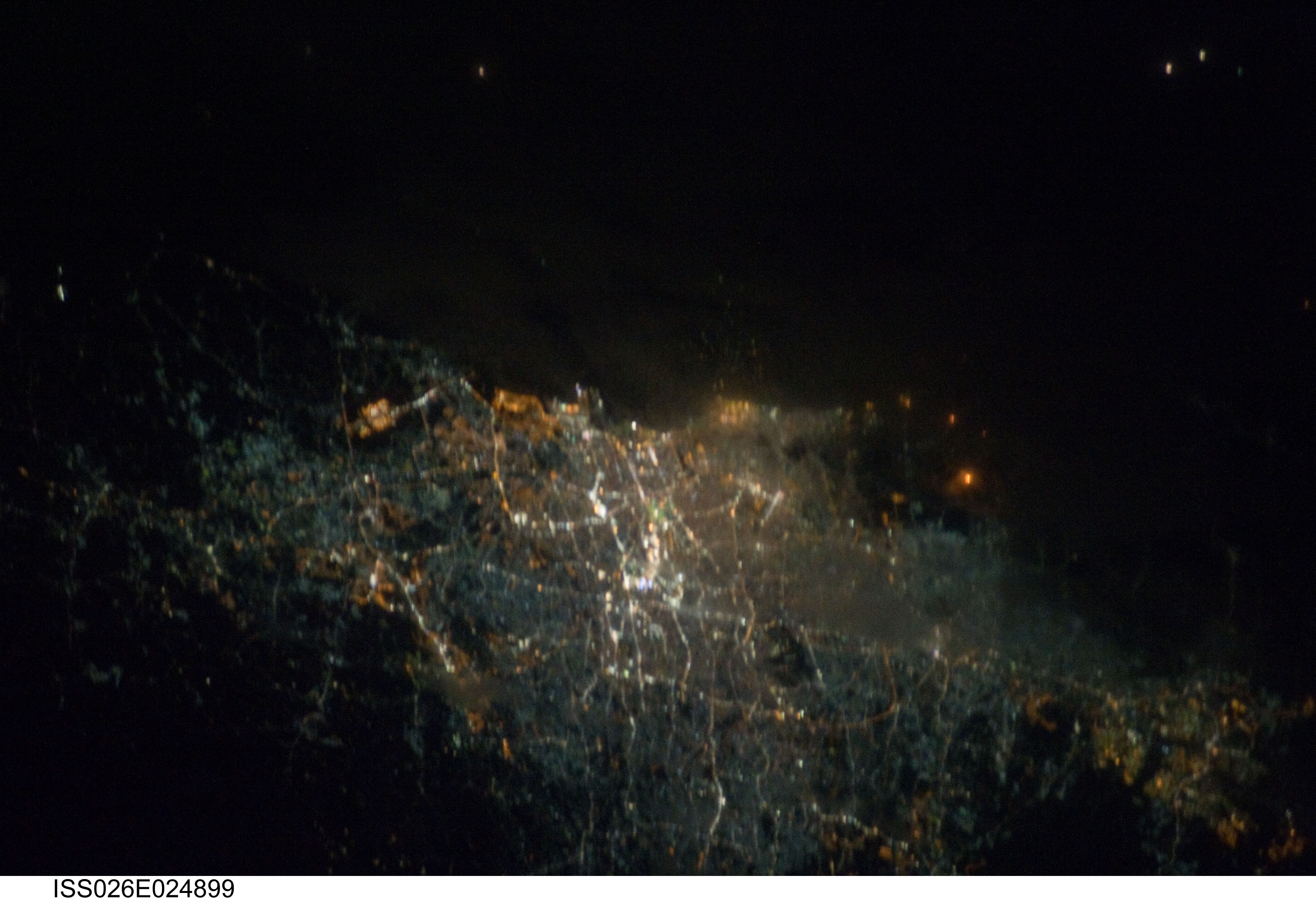
Jakarta in 2011, from the ISS

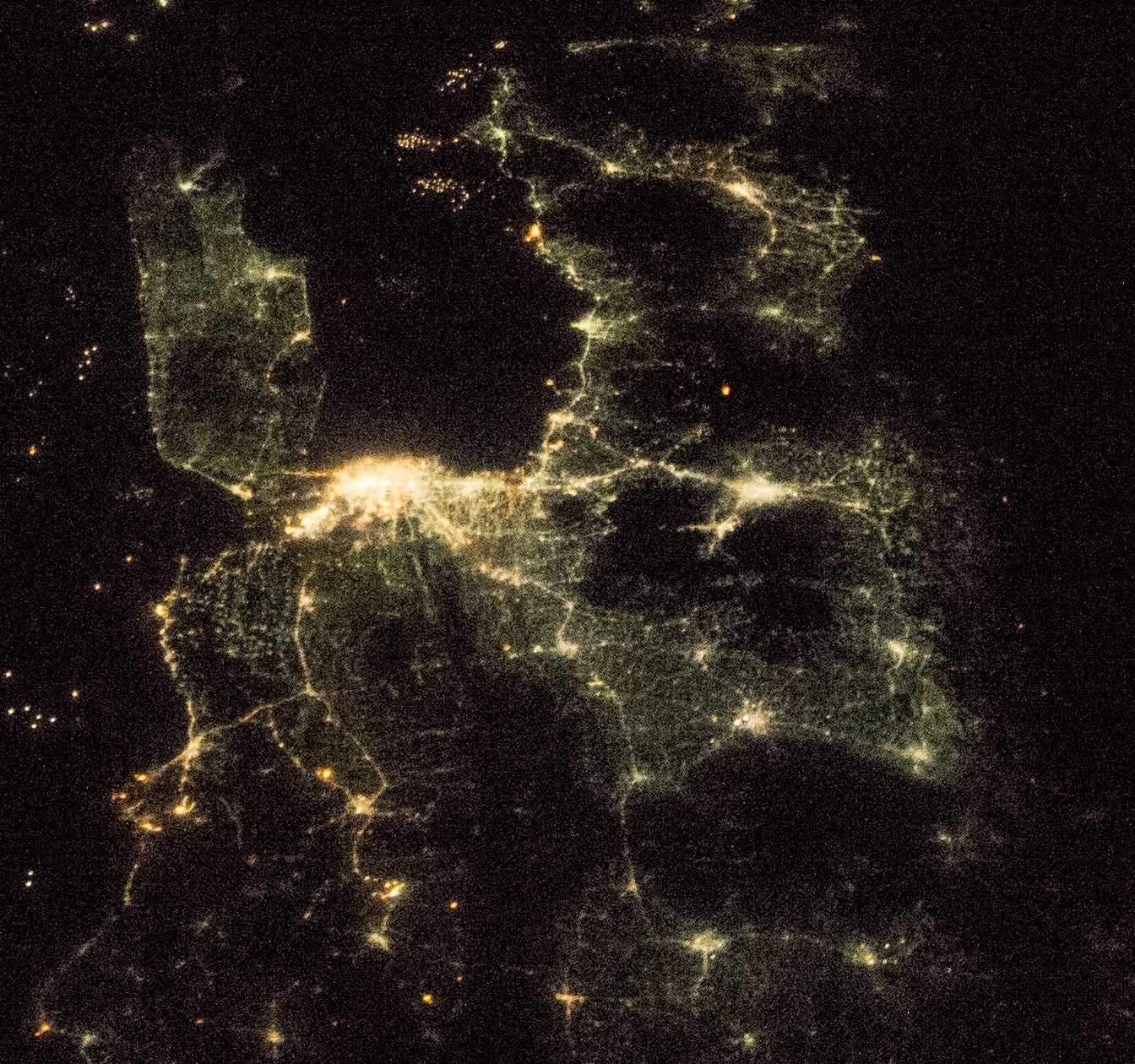
Surabaya in 2014, from the ISS

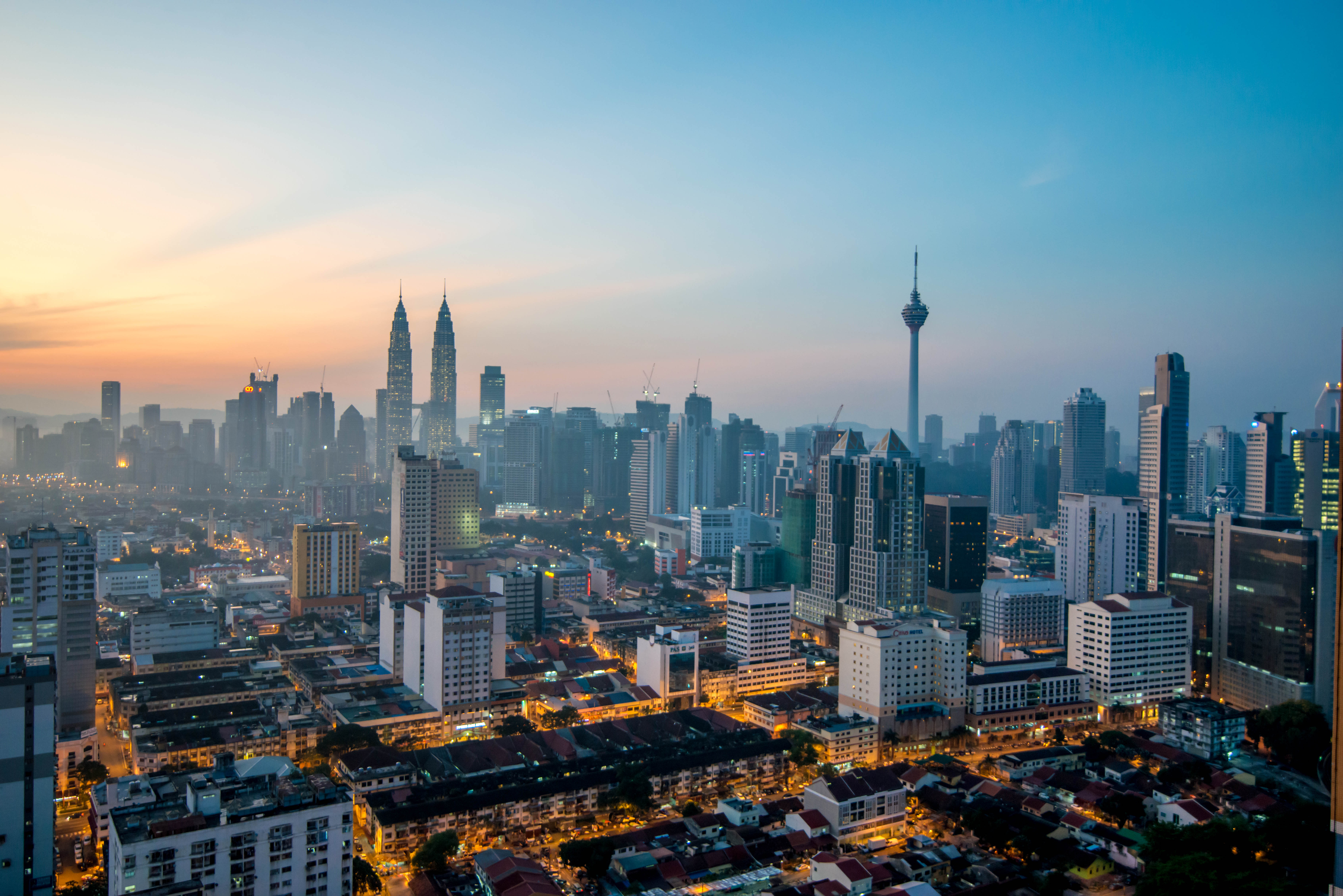
Kuala Lumpur, Malaysia

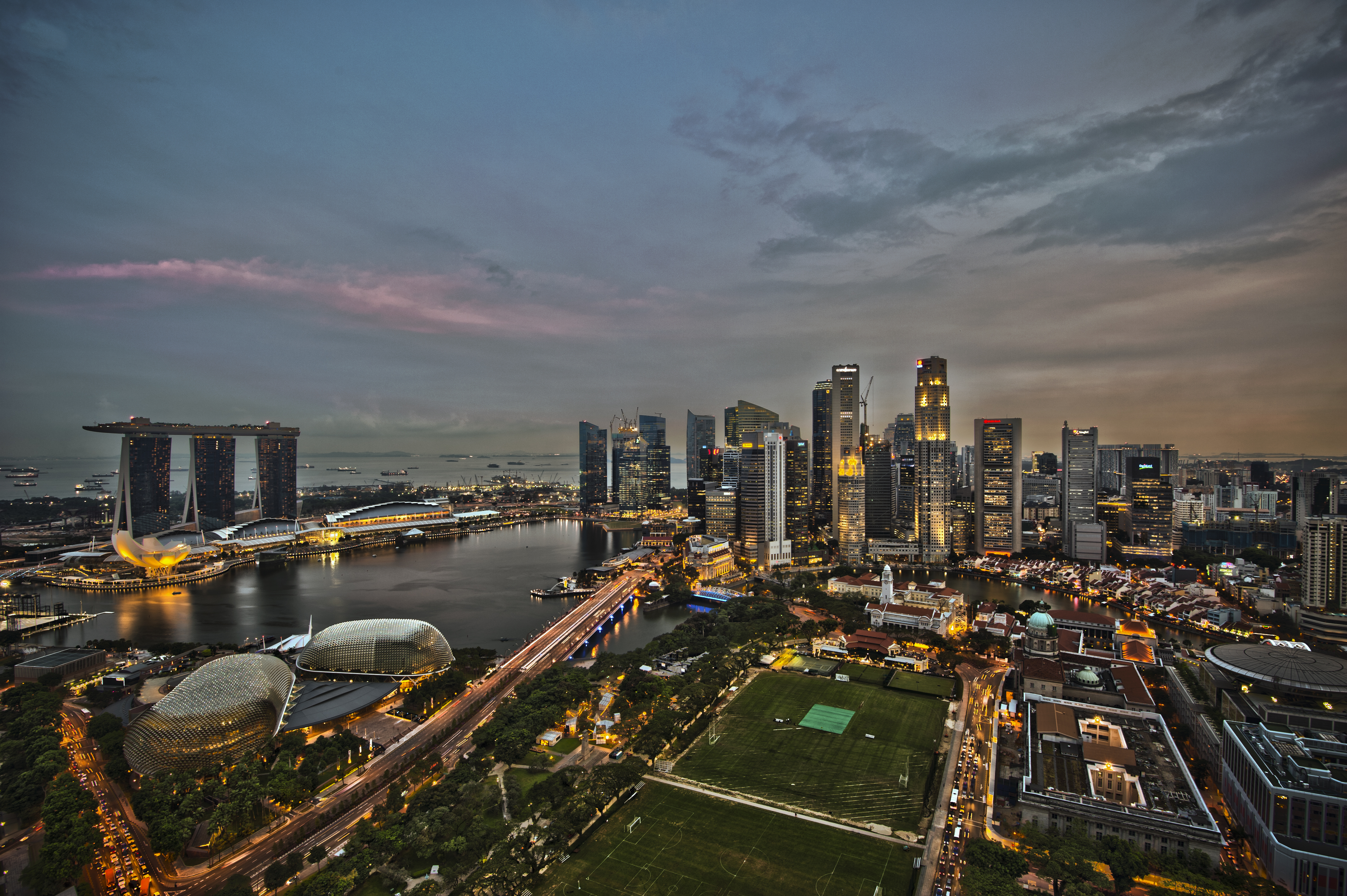
Singapore

Country	Megalopolis	Major cities and areas	Population estimate
Indonesia	Jakarta metropolitan area (Jabodetabekpunjur)	Jakarta, Bogor, Depok, Tangerang and Bekasi	54,900,000
Indonesia	Surabaya metropolitan area (Gerbangkertosusila)	Gresik, Bangkalan, Mojokerto, Surabaya, Sidoarjo and Lamongan	19,700,000
Philippines	Mega Manila	Regions Central Luzon, Metro Manila, Calabarzon, Mimaropa excluding Palawan, and regional centers San Fernando-Manila-Calamba-Calapan	41,100,000
Thailand	Bay of Bangkok Economic Rim	Bangkok–Ayutthaya–Pattaya	20,800,000
Vietnam	Red River Delta	Hanoi, Hai Phong, Nam Định, and Hải Dương	21,000,000
Vietnam	Southeast Economic Zone	Đồng Nai, Bình Dương, Ho Chi Minh City, Bà Rịa–Vũng Tàu province, Long An, Tiền Giang	22,900,000

Note: The Indonesian megalopolis names come from acronyms of the included cities.

=== South Asia ===
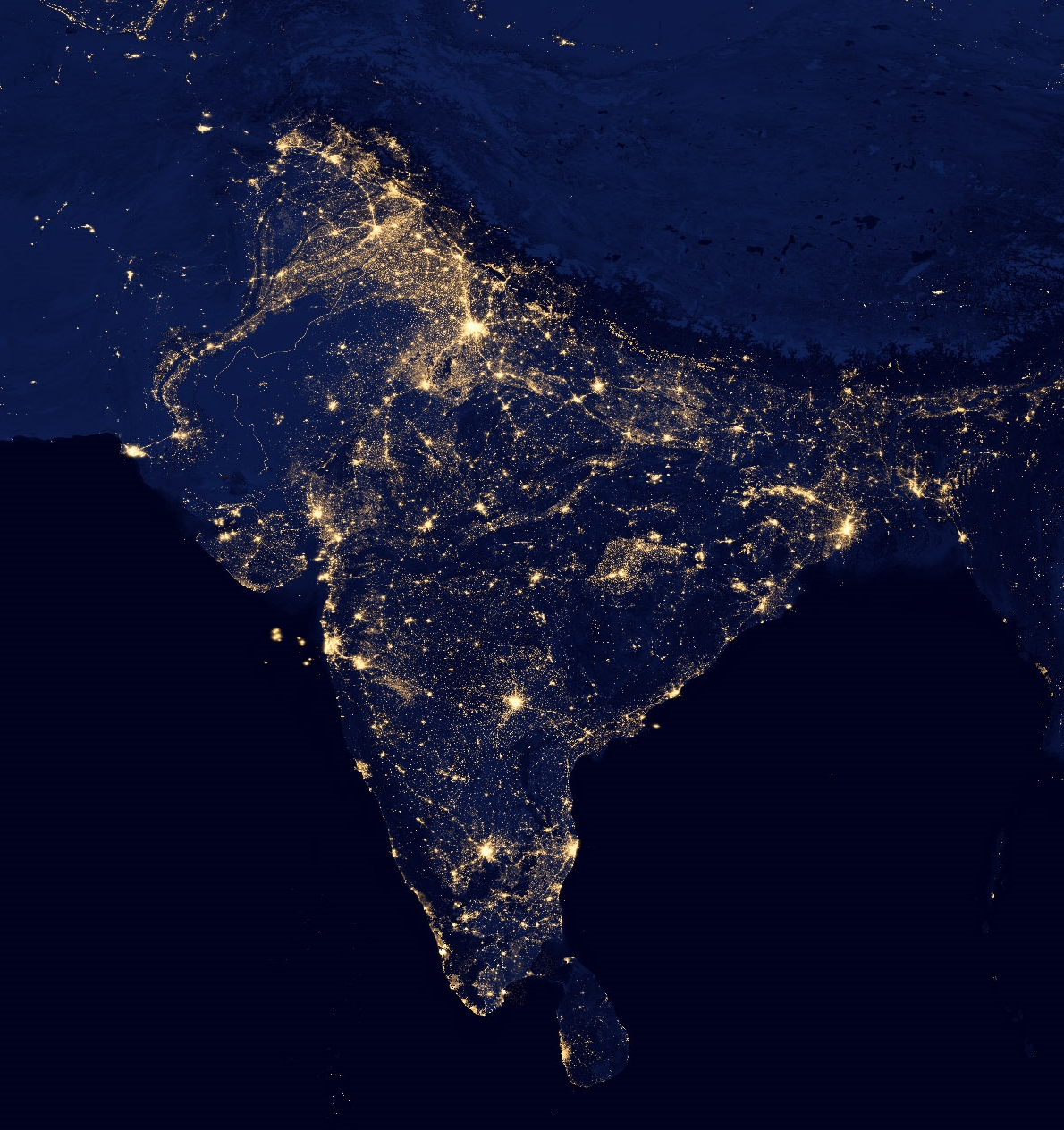
Satellite view of Indian Subcontinent

Country	Megalopolis	Major cities and areas	Population estimate
Bangladesh	Dhaka Megalopolis	Cities of Dhaka, Gazipur, Narayanganj, Tongi, Savar, Siddhirganj, Keraniganj, Fatullah	21,551,232
India	Chennai Megalopolis	Districts of Chennai, Kanchipuram, Tiruvallur, Chengalpattu, Ranipet	12,400,000
India	Delhi-NCR Megalopolis	Cities of Delhi, Faridabad, Ghaziabad, Gurugram, Meerut and Noida	46,000,000
India	Kolkata Megalopolis	Cities of Kolkata, Howrah, Hugli-Chuchura, Kalyani, Barrackpore, Barasat, Chandannagar	21,100,000
India	Mumbai Megalopolis	Cities of Mumbai, Thane, Navi Mumbai, Kalyan-Dombivali, Vasai-Virar, Panvel	27,100,000
Pakistan	GT Road Megalopolis	Cities of Lahore, Kasur, Gujranwala, Sheikhupura, Gujrat, Raiwind, Kamoke, Muridke, Ghakhar and Jehlum	21,325,075

=== Southwest Asia ===
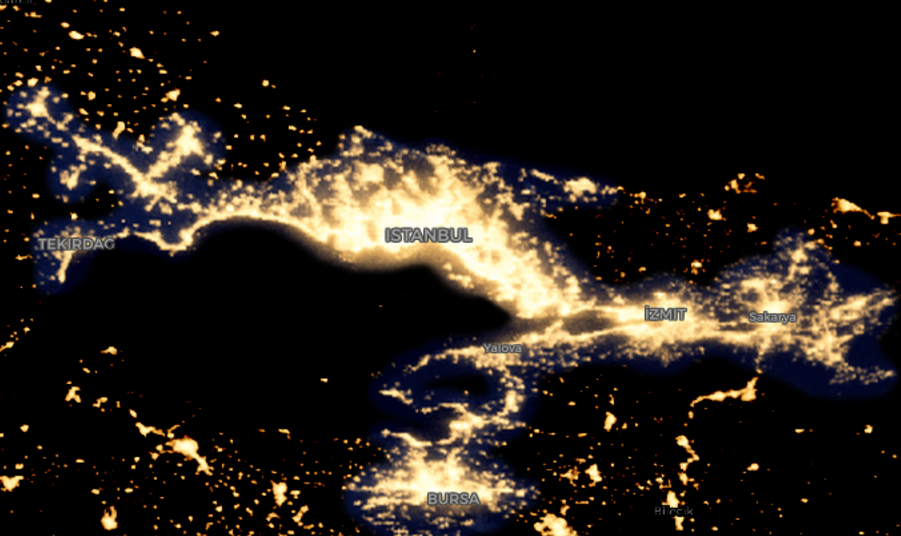
Istanbul, Kocaeli, and Sakarya provinces at night

Country	Megalopolis	Major cities and areas	Population estimate
Iran	Greater Tehran	Tehran and Alborz provinces expanding into Mazandaran, Qazvin, and Qom	15,000,000
Turkey	Ista-Burs	Cities of Istanbul and Bursa; Gebze, Yalova, Izmit, and Adapazarı	22,376,297

== Europe ==
Major cities within a megalopolis

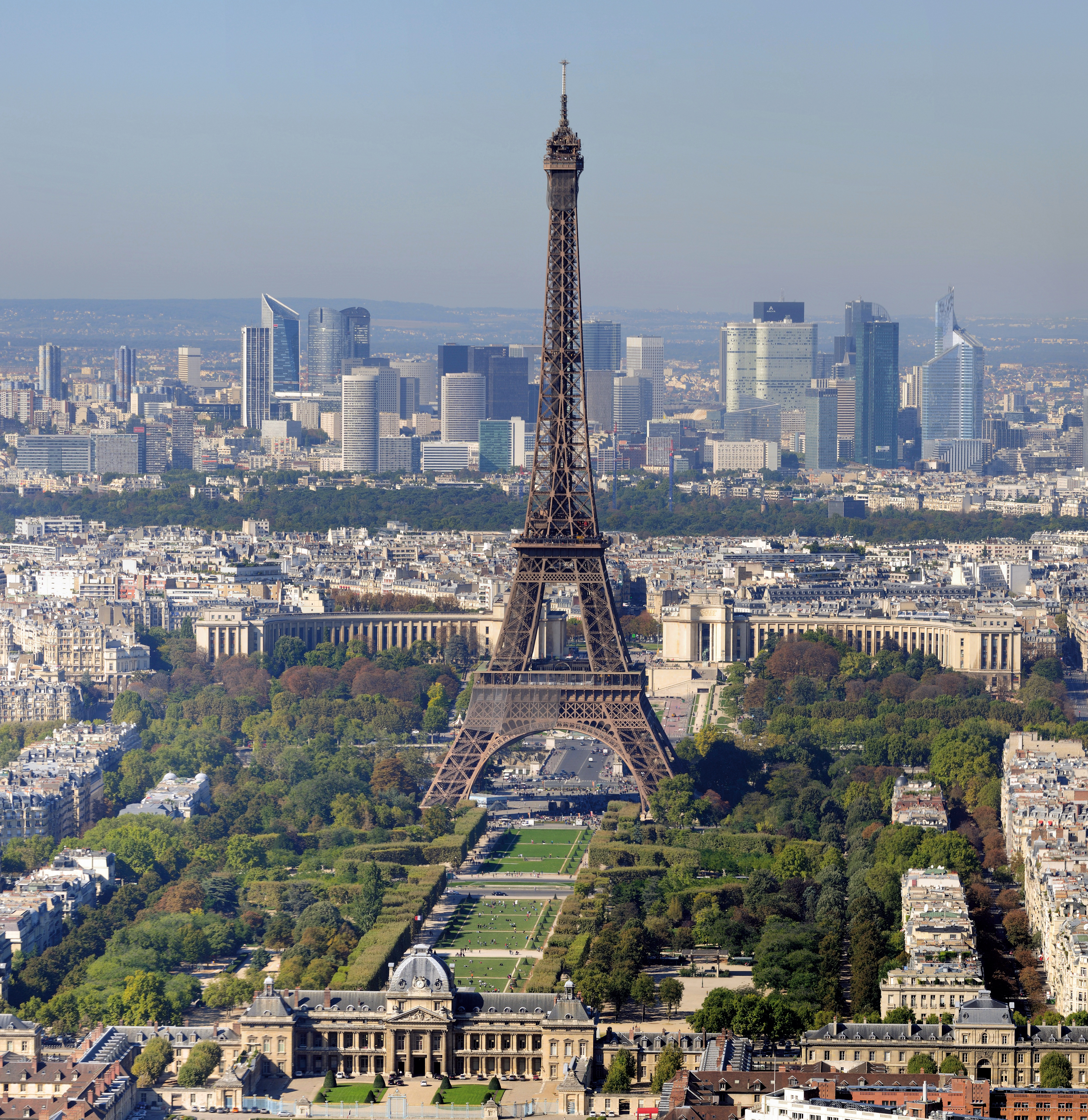
Paris, France

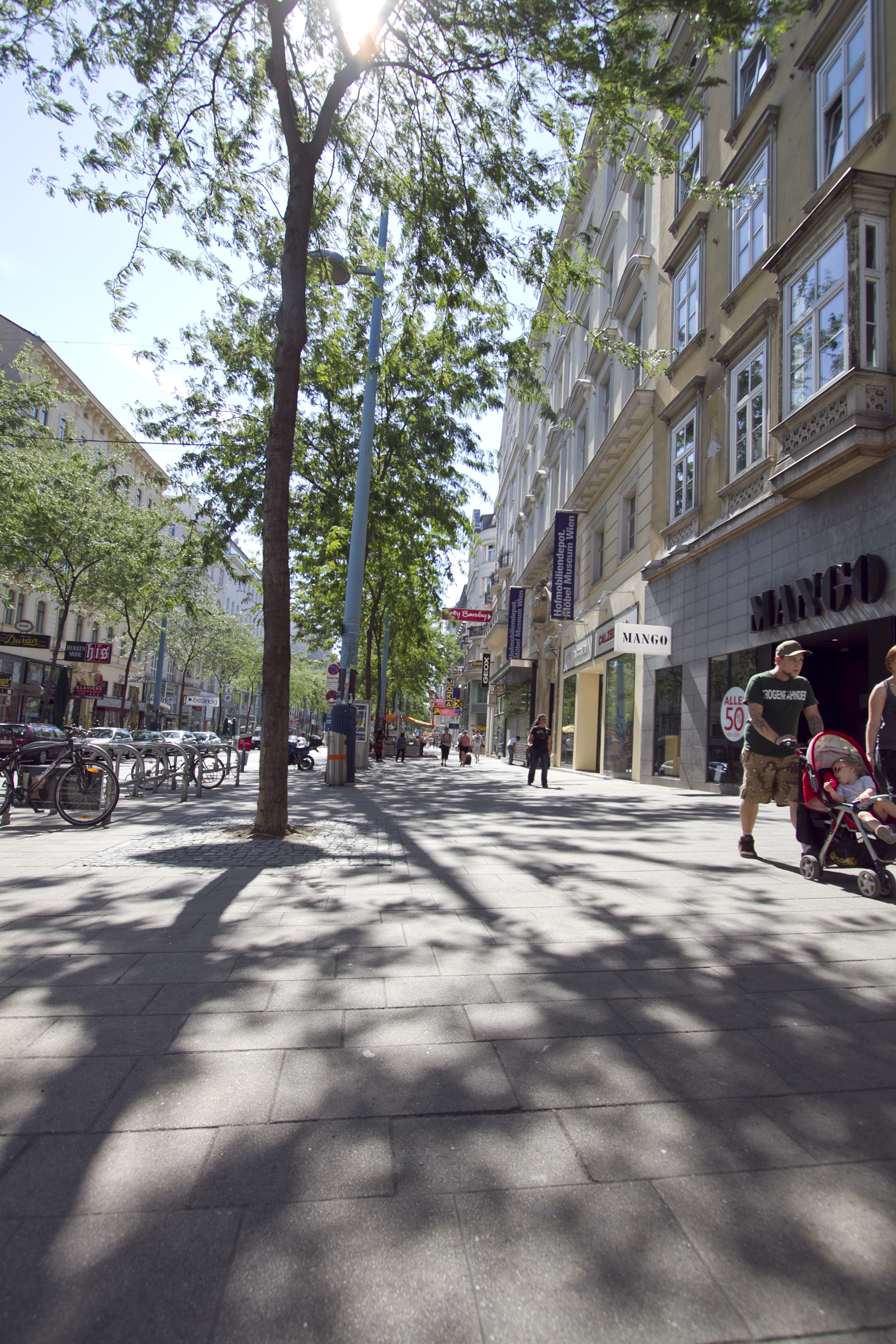
Vienna, Austria

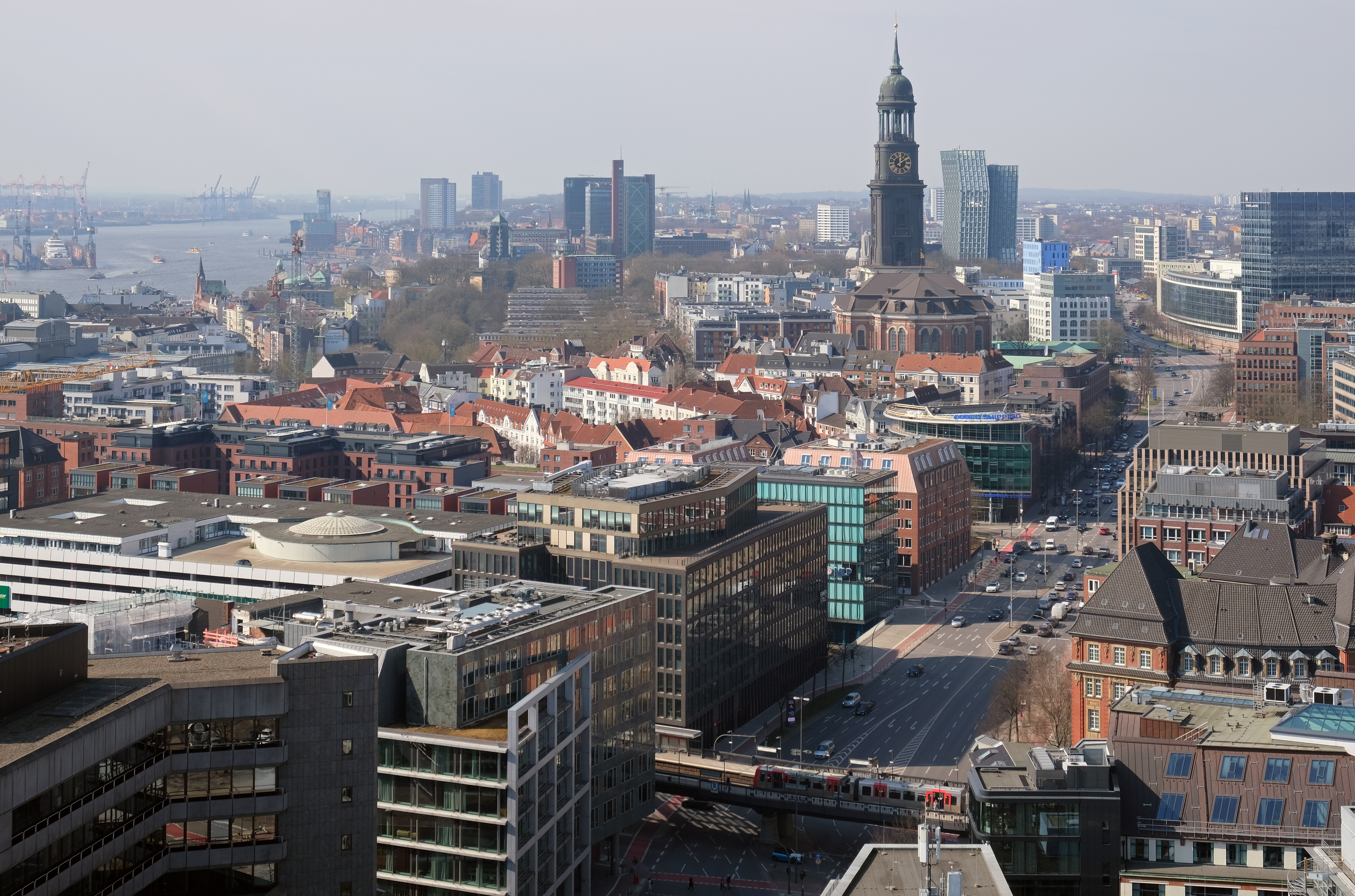
Hamburg, Germany

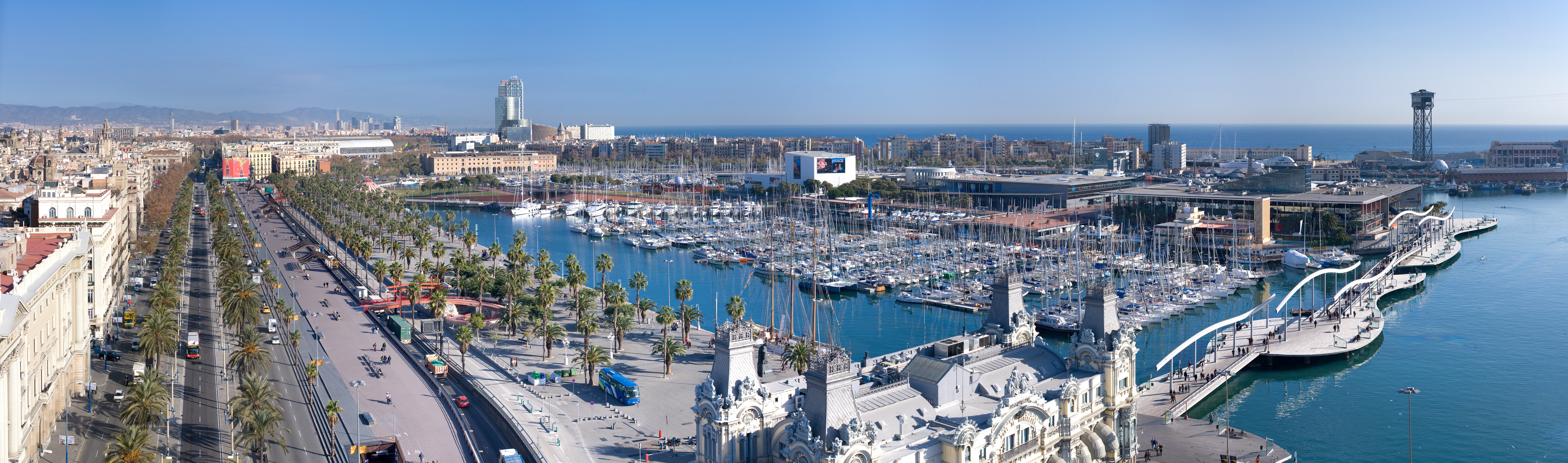
Barcelona, Spain

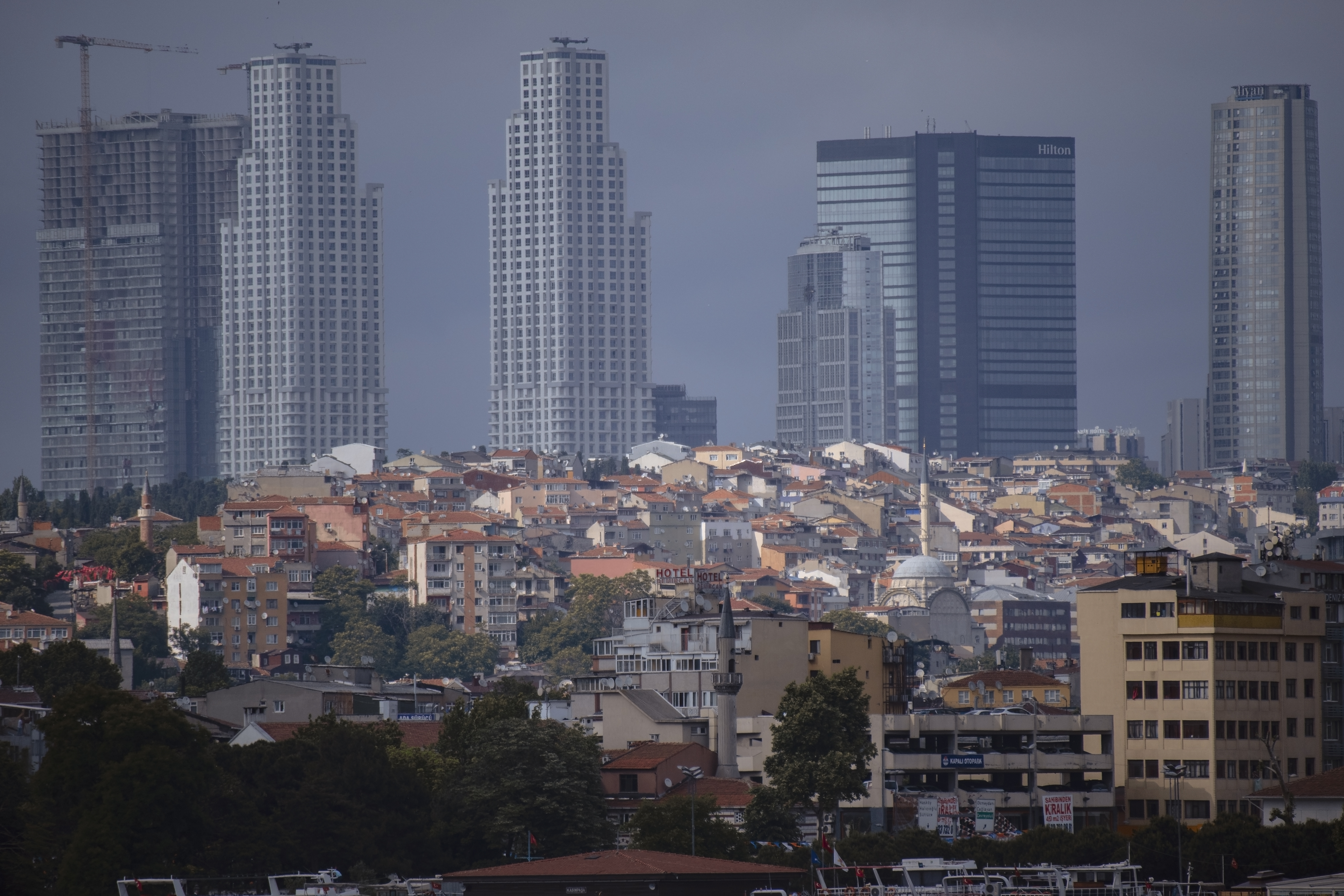
Istanbul, Turkey

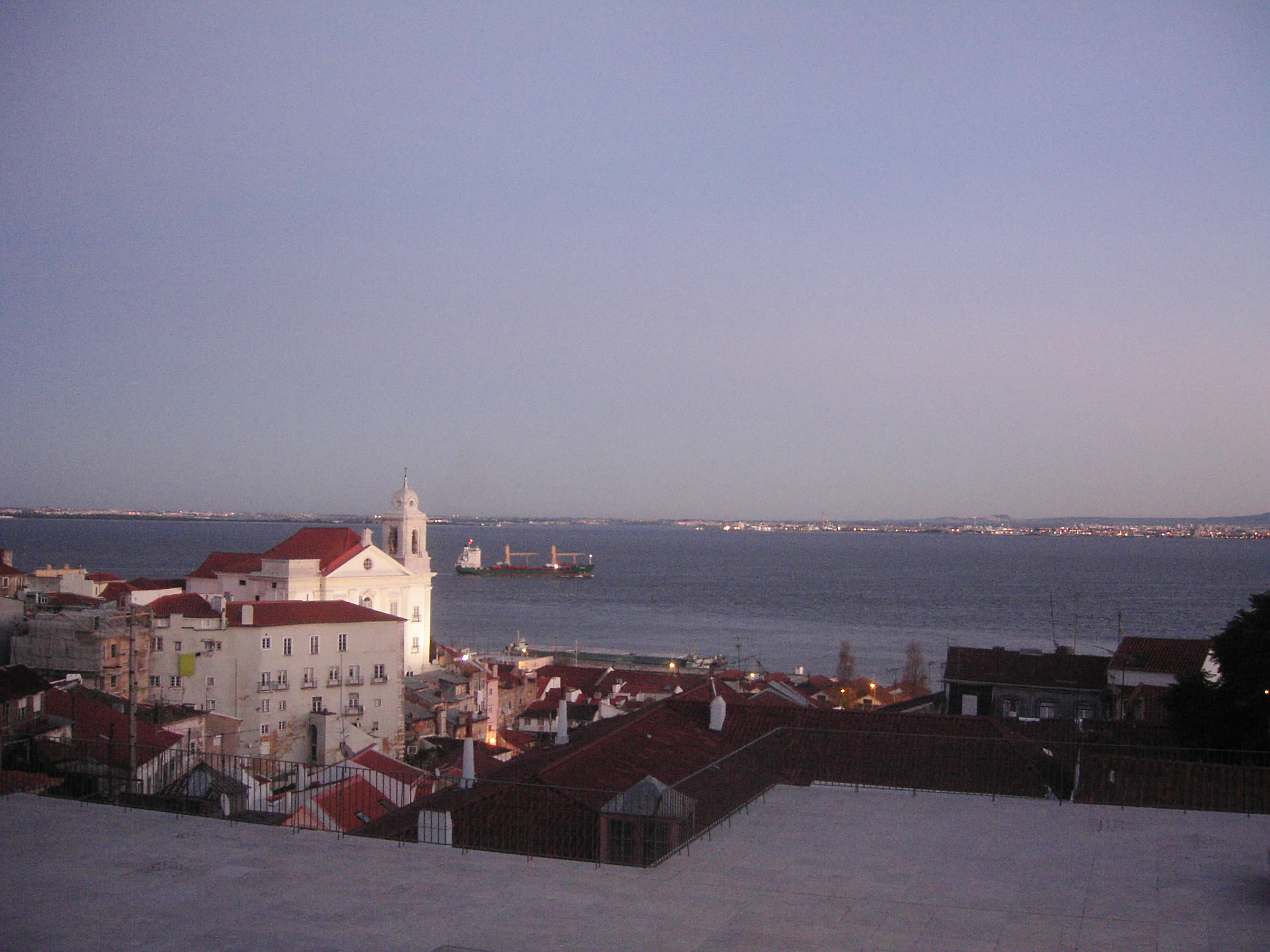
Lisbon, Portugal

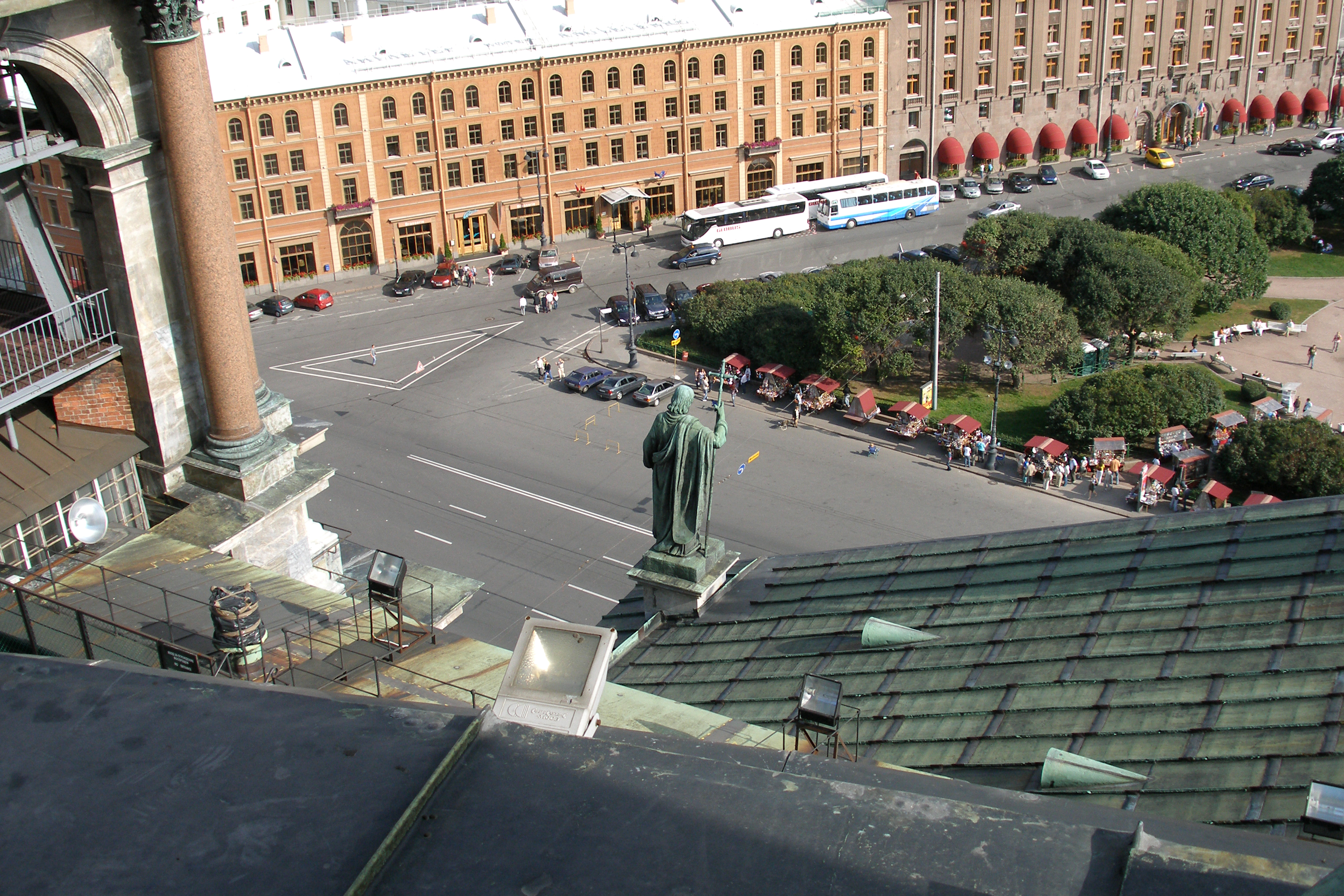
St. Petersburg, Russia

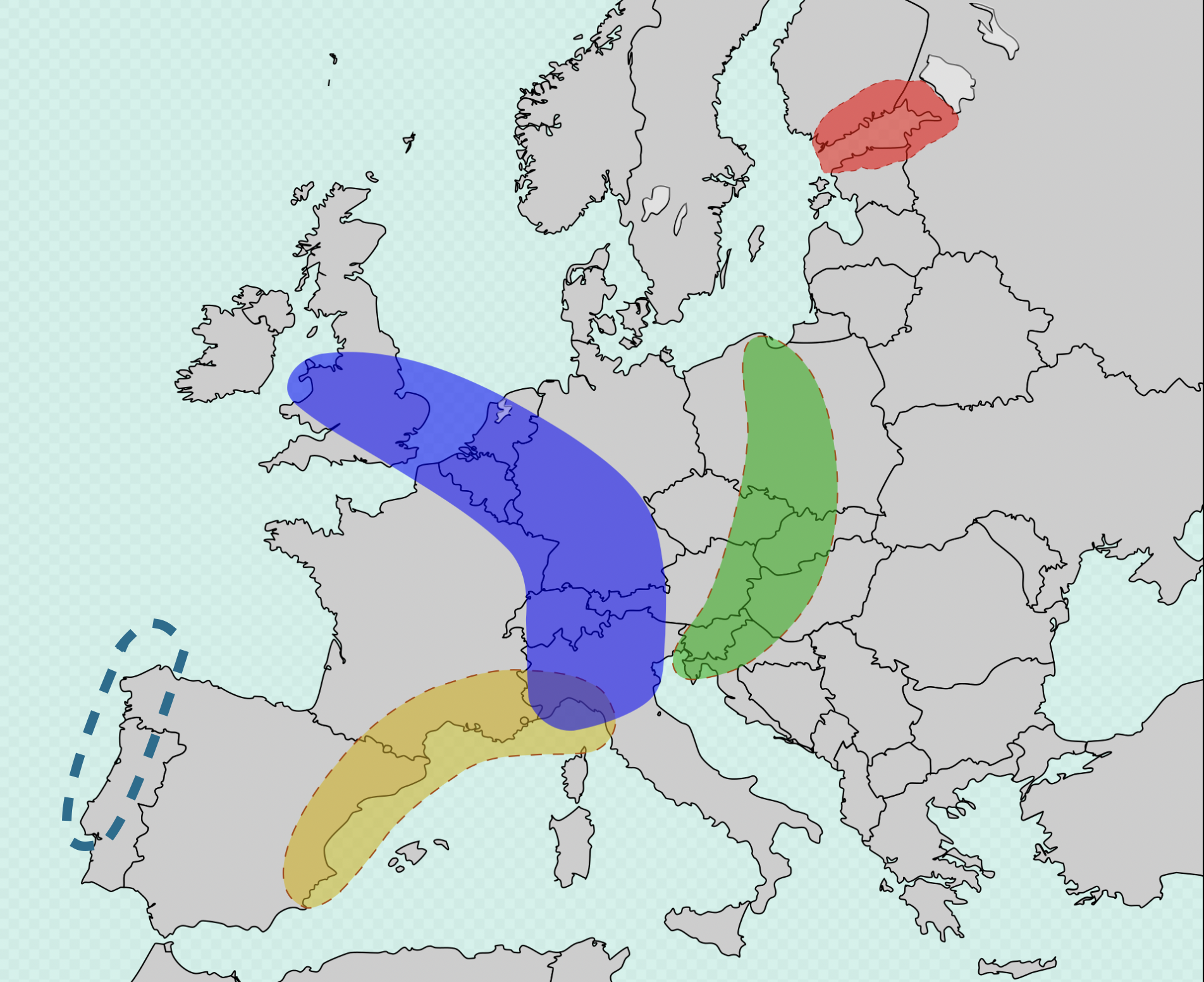
Blue, Green and Golden Bananas, Atlantic Axis and Gulf of Finland

Ordered by population estimate rather than alphabetical by country due to the number of countries included in each megalopolis.
These are not generally accepted names or groupings, and the cities listed are in many cases not contiguous.

Megalopolis	Major cities and areas	Population estimate
Blue Banana	United Kingdom: Liverpool, Manchester, Leeds, Sheffield, Leicester, Nottingham, Birmingham, Coventry, Milton Keynes, London Netherlands: Randstad (Amsterdam, Rotterdam, The Hague, Utrecht), Eindhoven Belgium: Brussels, Antwerp, Ghent, Charleroi, Liège Germany: Rhine-Ruhr, Frankfurt, Munich, Stuttgart, Nuremberg Luxembourg: Luxembourg France: Strasbourg, Reims, Lille, Metz, Nancy, Paris (Note: While initially excluded, has included in later versions) Switzerland: Zürich, Basel Italy: Turin, Milan, Venice Another designation within this area, covering Amsterdam, Munich, and Paris, is referred to as Am-Mun-Par.	110,000,000–130,000,000
Golden Banana	Italy: Turin, Genoa France: Nice, Toulon, Aix-en-Provence, Marseille, Nîmes, Montpellier, Narbonne, Perpignan Monaco: Monaco Andorra: Andorra Spain: Girona, Barcelona, L'Hospitalet de Llobregat, Terrassa, Sabadell, Badalona, Tarragona, Castellón de la Plana, Valencia, Alicante	40,000,000–45,000,000
Orange Banana	Ukraine: Odesa Romania: Constanţa Bulgaria: Varna, Burgas Turkey: Istanbul	30,000,000
Green Banana	Poland: Tricity, Bydgoszcz–Toruń, Warsaw, Łódź, Kraków, Katowice, Wrocław Czech Republic: Brno, Ostrava, Prague Slovakia: Bratislava Austria: Vienna Hungary: Budapest, Pécs, Győr, Székesfehérvár, Szombathely Croatia: Zagreb, Rijeka Slovenia: Ljubljana Italy: Trieste	40,000,000–45,000,000
STRING	Norway: Oslo (county Viken) Sweden: Gothenburg, Helsingborg, Malmö (counties Västra Götaland, Halland, Skåne) Denmark: Copenhagen (Capital Region of Denmark, Region of Southern Denmark) Germany: Hamburg, Kiel (Schleswig-Holstein state)	14,000,000
Atlantic Axis	Spain: Vigo, Ourense, Pontevedra, Santiago de Compostela, A Coruña Portugal: Setúbal, Lisbon, Santarém, Leiria, Coimbra, Viseu, Aveiro, Porto, Braga, Viana do Castelo	12,000,000
Gulf of Finland	Finland: Kotka, Kouvola, Espoo, Helsinki, Vantaa, Lappeenranta, Lahti Russian Federation: Gatchina, Saint Petersburg, Vyborg, Sosnovy Bor Estonia: Tallinn, Narva, Tartu	9,000,000

== North America ==
Country	Megalopolis	Major cities and areas	Population estimate
Canada United States	Cascadia	Canada: Abbotsford, Surrey, Vancouver (BC), Victoria United States: Bellevue, Eugene, Everett, Portland (OR), Salem, Seattle, Tacoma, Spokane, Tri-Cities, Vancouver (WA)	8,400,000
Canada United States	Great Lakes	Canada: Brampton, Cambridge, Hamilton, Kingston, Kitchener, London, Markham, Mississauga, Montreal, Niagara Falls, Oshawa, Ottawa, Quebec City, Richmond Hill, Toronto, Vaughan, Waterloo, Windsor; United States: Akron, Ann Arbor, Buffalo, Canton, Chicago, Cincinnati, Cleveland, Columbus, Dayton, Des Moines, Detroit, Duluth, Erie, Flint, Fort Wayne, Green Bay, Grand Rapids, Indianapolis, Kalamazoo, Kansas City, Lansing, Louisville, Madison, Milwaukee, Minneapolis, Omaha, Pittsburgh, Quad Cities, Rochester (NY), Rochester (MN), Rockford, Traverse City, Saginaw, St. Louis, Saint Paul, Sandusky, South Bend, Toledo, Youngstown	59,100,000
Canada	Quebec City–Windsor Corridor	Hamilton, Kingston, Kitchener, London, Markham, Mississauga, Montreal, Oshawa, Ottawa, Peterborough, Quebec City, Richmond Hill, Toronto, Trois-Rivières, Vaughan, Waterloo, Windsor	18,400,000
Mexico	Bajío	Guadalajara, León, Querétaro, Aguascalientes, Celaya, Irapuato, San Juan del Río, Salamanca	11,000,000
Mexico	Mexico City megalopolis	Mexico City, Puebla, Cuernavaca, Toluca, Pachuca, Tula, Tlaxcala, Cuautla, Tulancingo	30,800,000
Mexico United States	Southern California	Mexico: Tijuana United States: Anaheim, Bakersfield, Long Beach, Los Angeles, Oceanside, Riverside, San Bernardino, San Diego	24,400,000
United States	North East Corridor	Albany, Arlington, Baltimore, Boston, Brookhaven, Hartford, Hempstead, Jersey City, Newark, New Haven, New York City, Philadelphia, Providence, Springfield, Washington D.C.	50,000,000
United States	Further information: Megaregions of the United States		

== South America ==
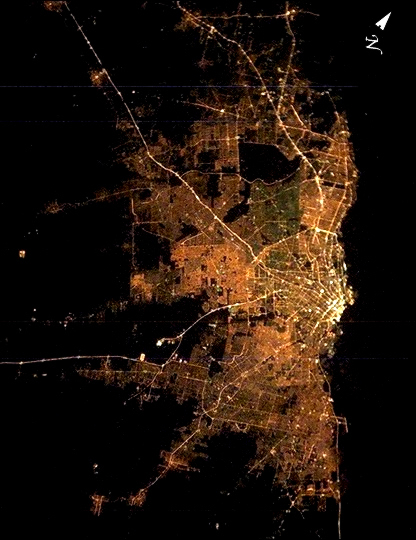
Satellite image of Greater Buenos Aires at night

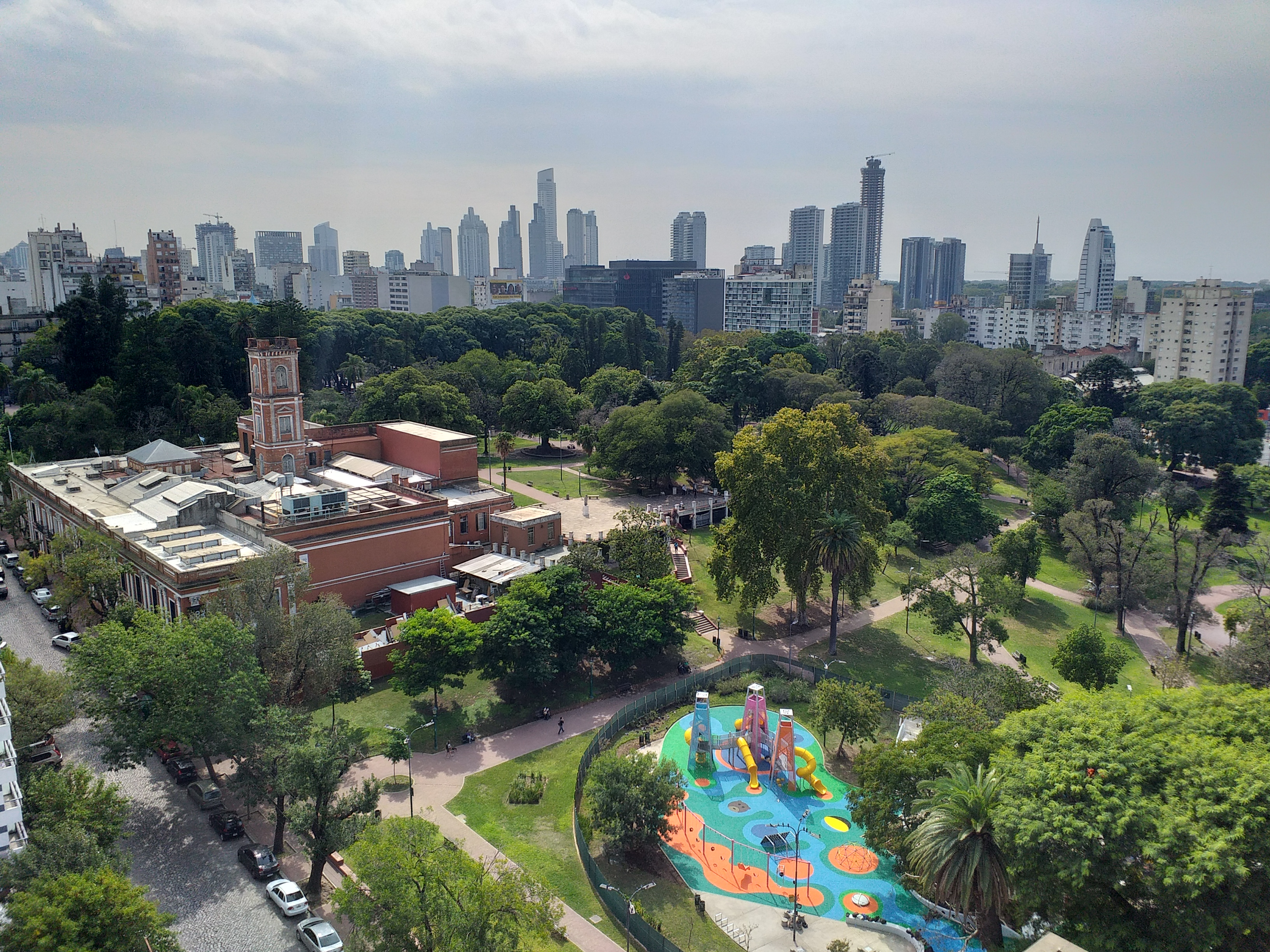
Parque Lezama, Buenos Aires

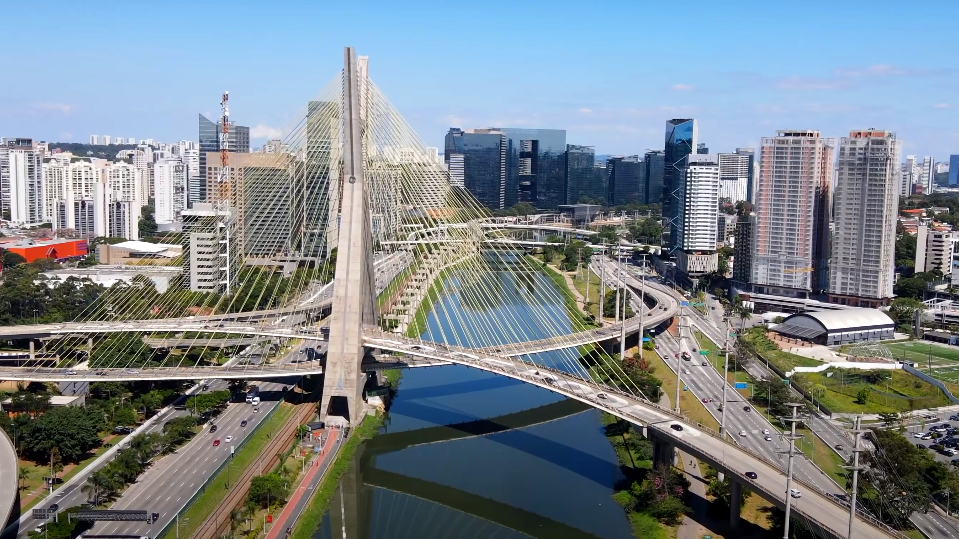
Ponte Estaiada, São Paulo

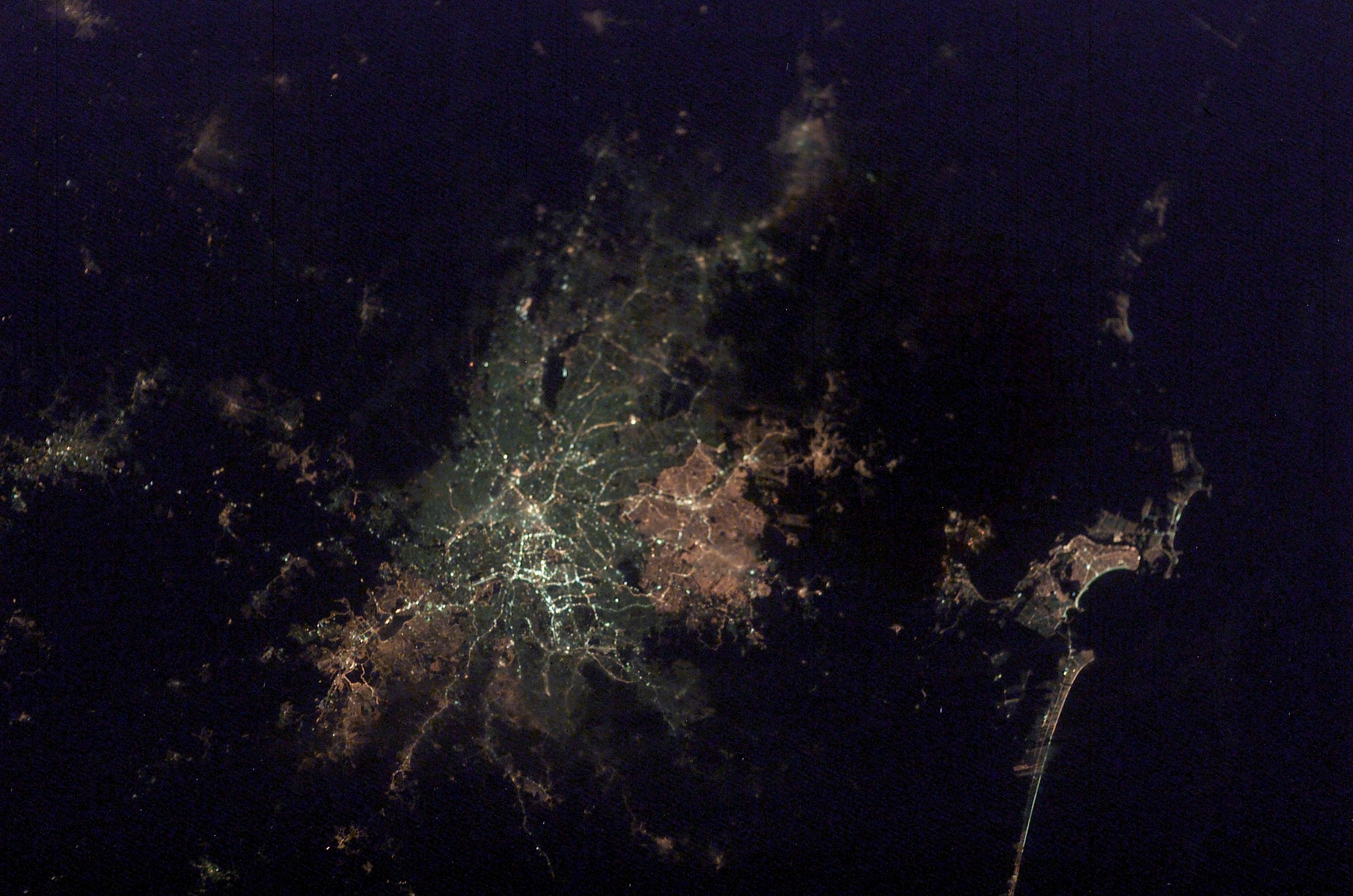
Expanded Metropolitan Complex of São Paulo, Brazil

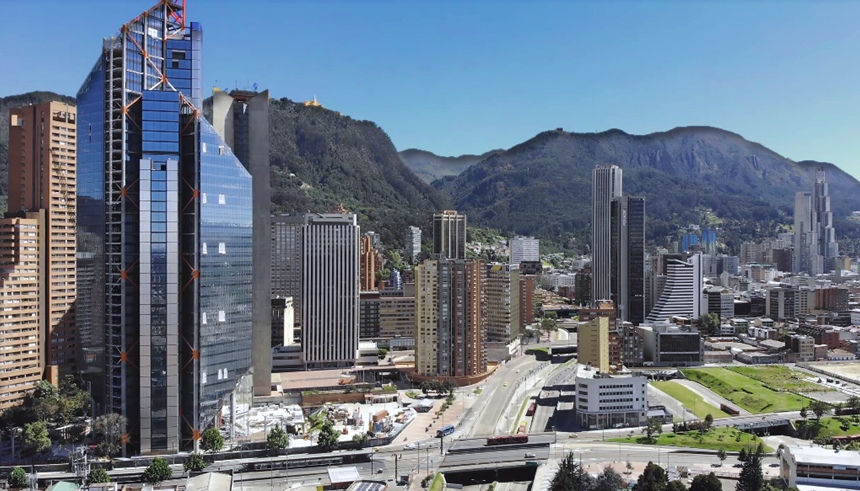
Bogotá Skyline

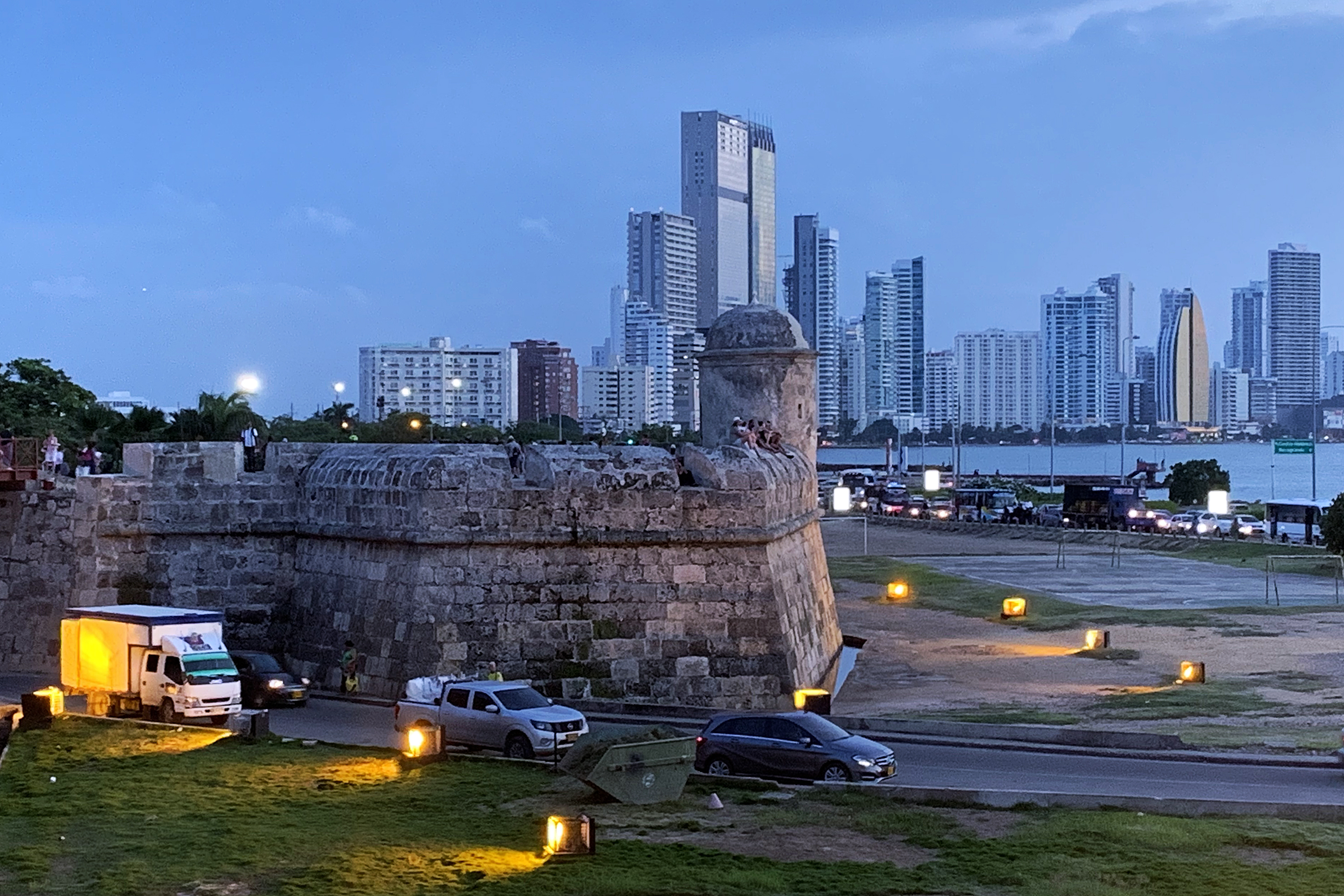
Cartagena de Indias

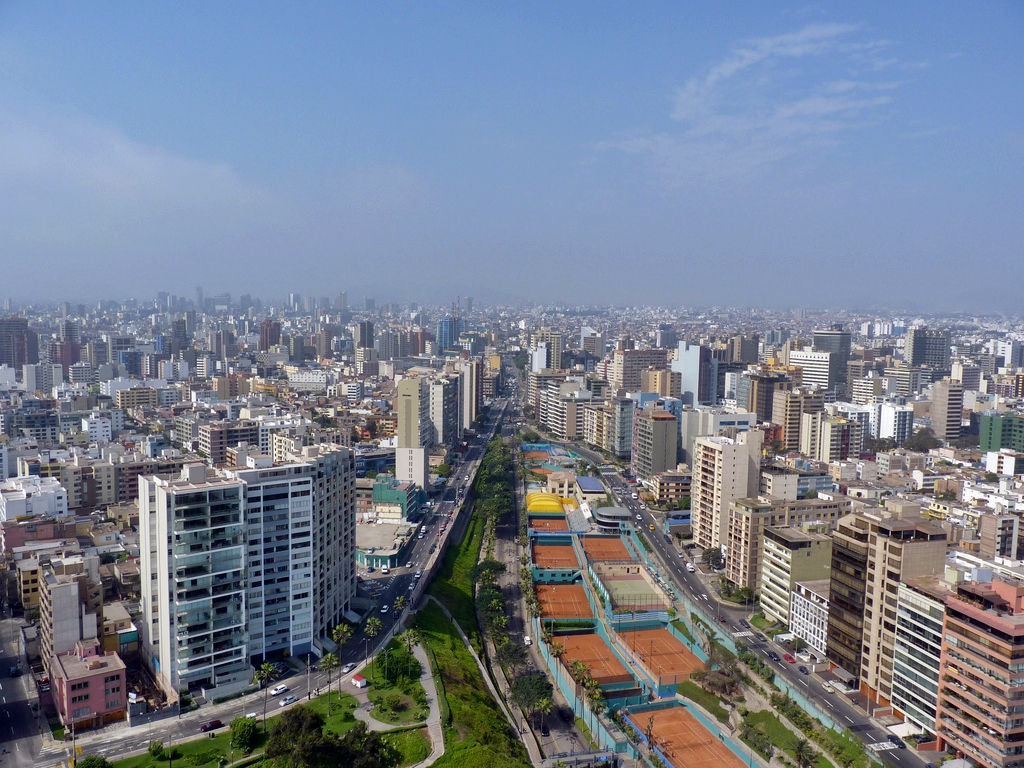
Lima, Perú

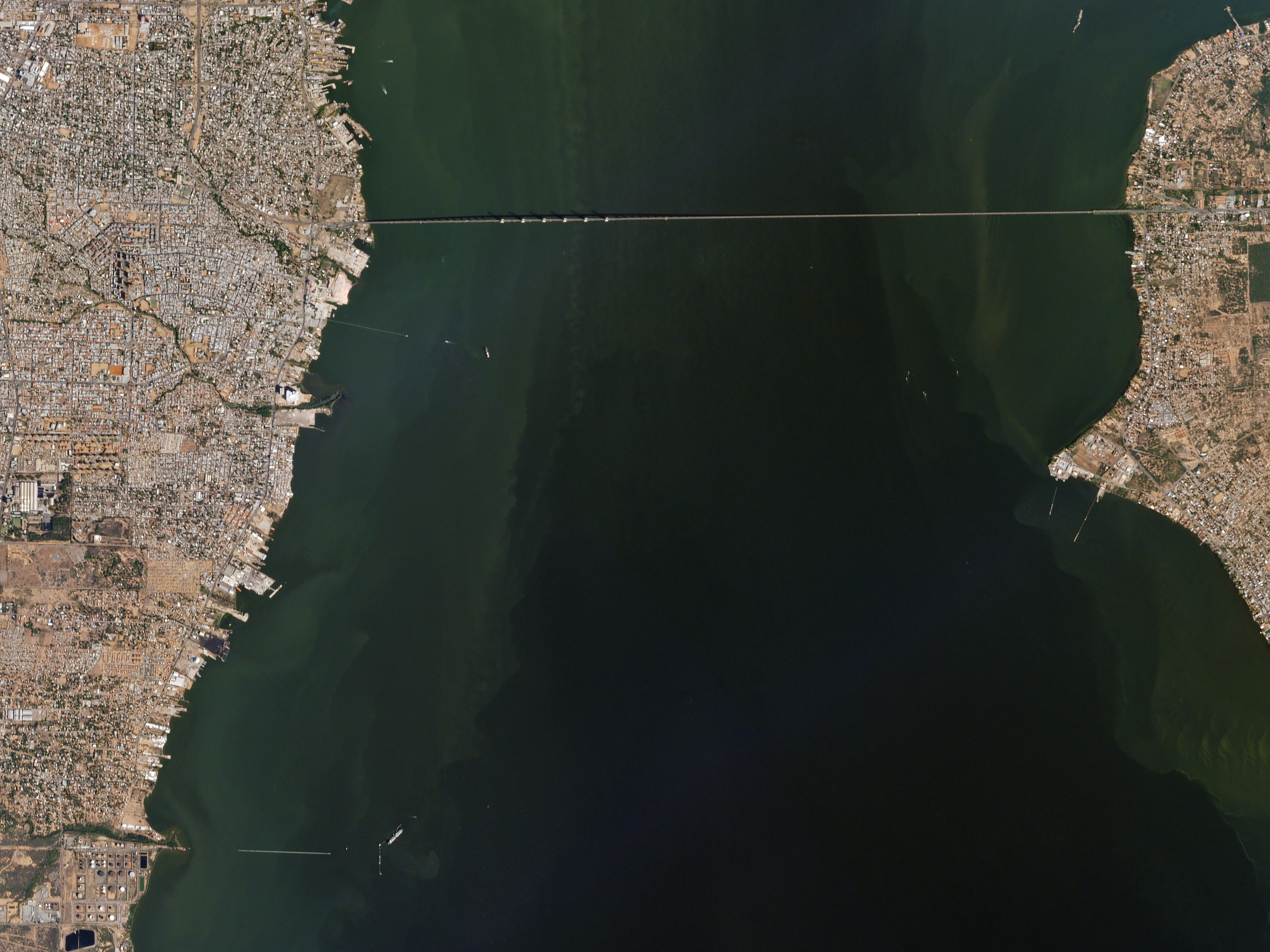
Maracaibo Lake Narrows, the city of Maracaibo connected by bridge to the Eastern Coast cities.

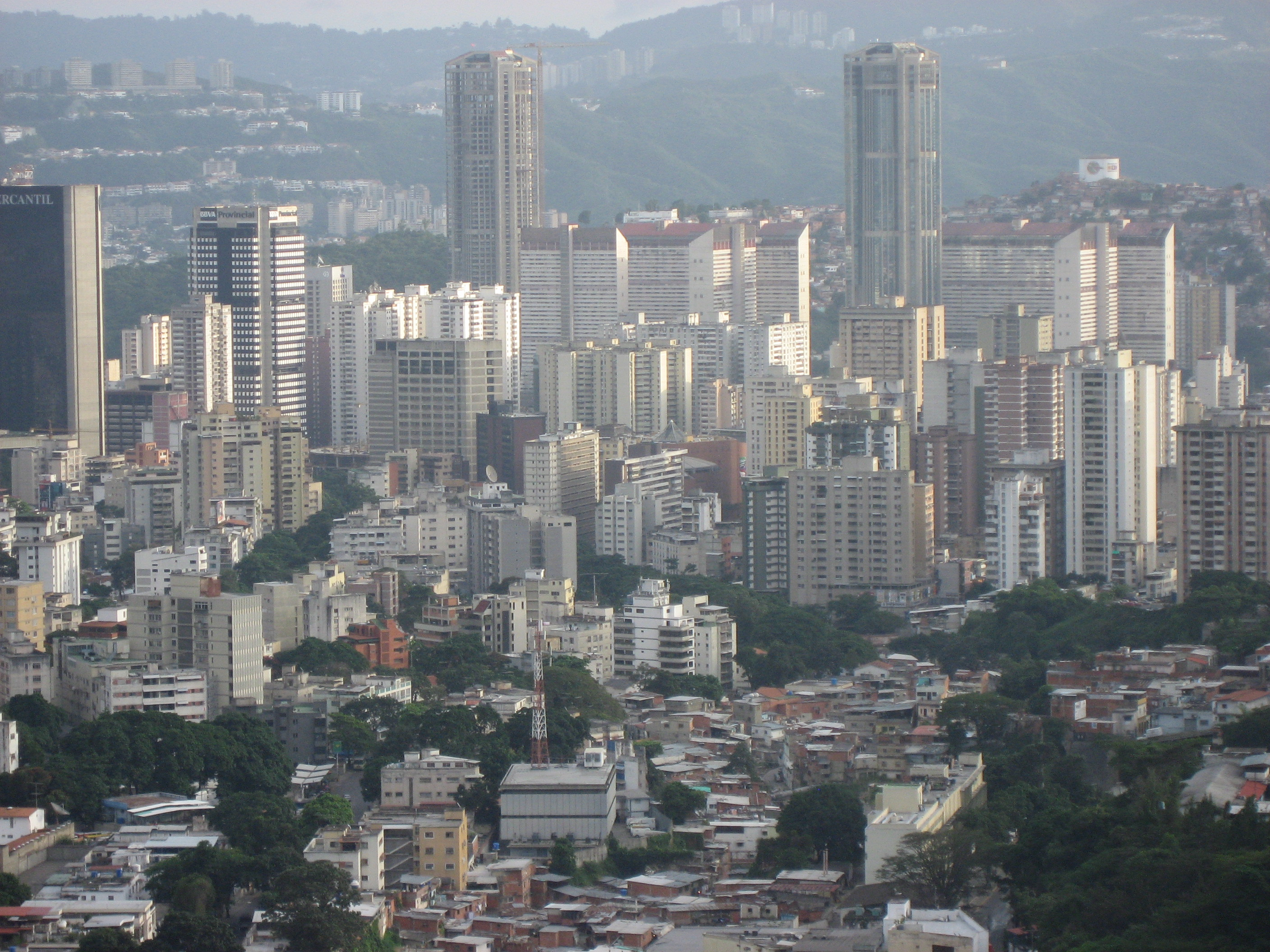
Caracas, Venezuela

Country	Megalopolis	Major cities and areas	Population estimate
ArgentinaUruguay	Río de la Plata-Paraná Megaregion	Greater Buenos Aires, Montevideo metropolitan area, Rosario metropolitan area, Greater La Plata, Santa Fé, Paraná, Punta del Este, Maldonado, Colonia del Sacramento, Zárate, Luján, Campana, San Nicolás de los Arroyos and San Pedro	22,016,634
Brazil	Eixo Goiânia-Anápolis-Brasília	Greater Goiânia and Federal District (Brazil)	8,000,000
Brazil	Greater Belo Horizonte	Belo Horizonte and Contagem	5,800,000
Brazil	Greater Curitiba	Curitiba and São José dos Pinhais	3,500,000
Brazil	Greater Porto Alegre	Porto Alegre and Canoas	4,200,000
Brazil	Greater Rio de Janeiro	Rio de Janeiro, Baixada Fluminense, and Niterói-São Gonçalo	13,000,000
Brazil	Recife metropolitan area	Recife and Jaboatão dos Guararapes	3,900,000
Brazil	Rio de Janeiro–São Paulo Megalopolis	São Paulo Macrometropolis and Greater Rio de Janeiro	51,500,000
Brazil	Salvador metropolitan area	Salvador and Camaçari	3,900,000
Colombia	Golden Triangle	Bogotá, Soacha, Medellín, Cali, Cartago, Tuluá, Buga, Bello, Manizales, Armenia, Pereira, Dosquebradas, Ibagué, Girardot, El Espinal and Fusagasugá	29,500,000
Colombia	Northeast Atlantic Region	Barranquilla, Cartagena, Santa Marta, Ciénaga, Malambo, Baranoa and Turbaco	6,000,000
Colombia	Pacific Belt	Medellín, Cali, Bello, Pereira, Manizales, Armenia, Itagüí, Yumbo, Tuluá, Cartago, Buga and Palmira	9,000,000
Colombia	Santander Belt	Bucaramanga, Floridablanca, Girón, Piedecuesta, Cúcuta, Ocaña, Villa del Rosario and Pamplona	3,000,000
Chile	Santiago-Valparaíso	Santiago, Valparaíso-Viña del Mar and Rancagua	8,000,000
Peru	Lima-Callao Megalopolis	Lima and Callao	12,523,796
Venezuela	Caracas-Valencia	Caracas, Valencia, and Maracay	9,000,000
Venezuela	Maracaibo Lake Narrows	Maracaibo, Cabimas and Ciudad Ojeda	3,500,000

== See also ==
- Capital city
- Megalopolises city
- Metropolitan city
- Metropolitan Transportation Authority
- List of largest cities
- Historical urban community sizes
- List of largest cities throughout history
- List of cities with over one million inhabitants
- List of towns and cities with 100,000 or more inhabitants
- List of largest cities by area
