= Metropolitan city =

A metropolitan city is an administrative division in some countries. It may refer to:

- Metropolitan cities of Italy, administrative divisions of Italy covering the main city and its metropolitan area
- Metropolitan cities of Australia, statistical divisions of Australia covering the main city and its metropolitan area, defined by Australian Bureau of Statistics
- Metropolitan municipalities in Turkey, districts includes a corresponding district municipality in Turkey
- Metropolitan municipalities in South Africa, municipalities which executes all the functions of local government for a city or conurbation in South Africa
- Metropolitan Municipality of Lima, government entity of Lima, Peru
- Metropolis GZM, metropolitan city-unit in Poland
- Metropolitan City, a type of provincial-level city of South Korea

== See also ==
- Metropolis
- Metropolitan
- Metropolitan area
- Metropolitan municipality
