= Super City =

Super City may refer to:

- Megalopolis, or a supercity, a chain of roughly adjacent metropolitan areas
- Super City, a 2016 video game by Mat Dickie
- Super City Rangers, a New Zealand basketball team
- Super City (store), a Mexican chain of convenience stores
- Super City, the byname of the new amalgamated Auckland Council of Auckland, New Zealand
- Super City (toy), a toy produced by Ideal Toys in 1967
- Super City (TV series), a comedy series
- ČD Supercity Pendolino, a train service in the Czech Republic and Slovakia
