= List of towns and cities with 100,000 or more inhabitants/country: C-D-E-F =

This is a list of towns and cities in the world believed to have 100,000 or more inhabitants, sorted by countries beginning with letters between C and F. Unless otherwise noted, populations are based on United Nations estimates from 2022.

Index

A-B • C-D-E-F • G-H-I-J-K • L-M-N-O • P-Q-R-S • T-U-V-W-Y-Z
Back to main page

== Cambodia ==
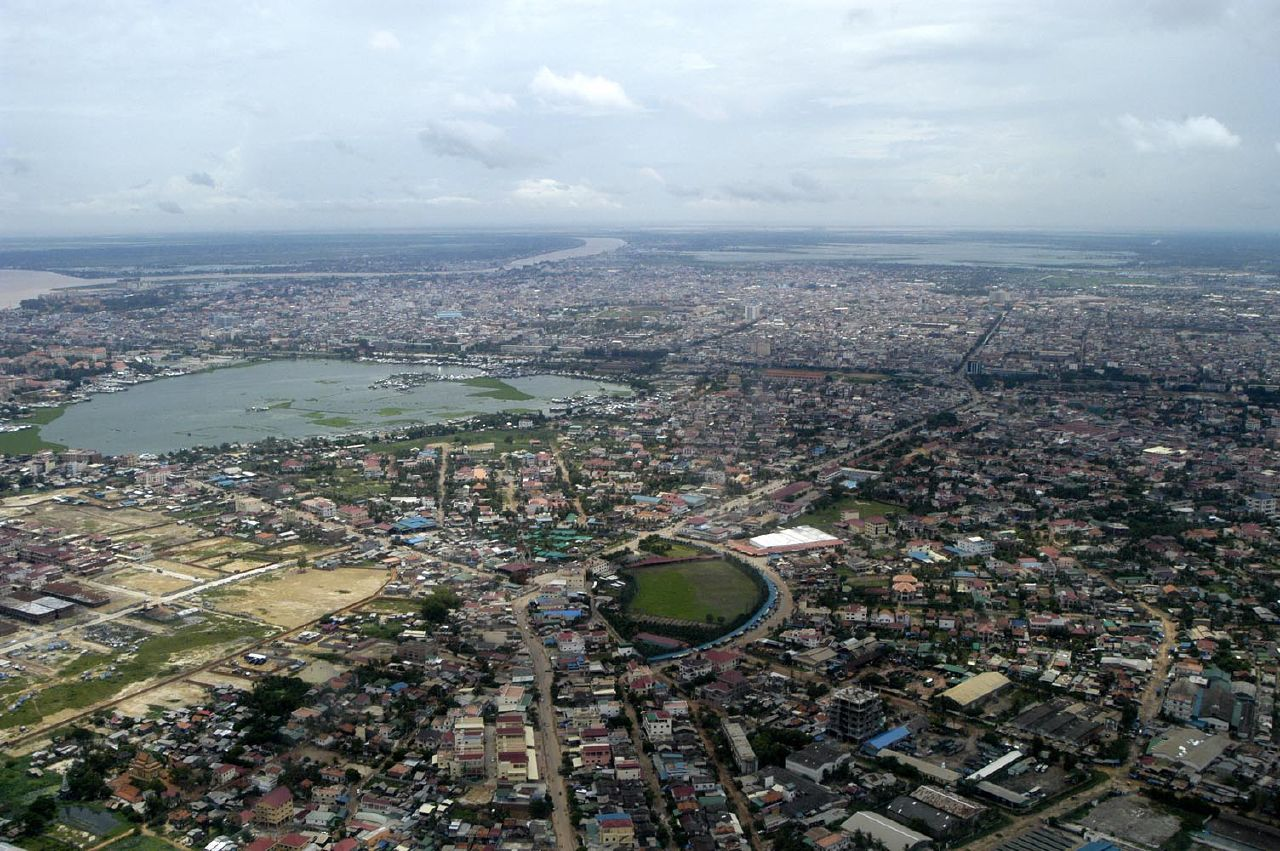
Phnom Penh

City	Province	Population (2023)
Bat Dambang	Battambang	150,444
Phnom Penh	Phnom Penh	1,573,544
Sihanoukville	Preah Sihanouk	156,691
Siem Reap	Siem Reap	139,458

== Cameroon ==
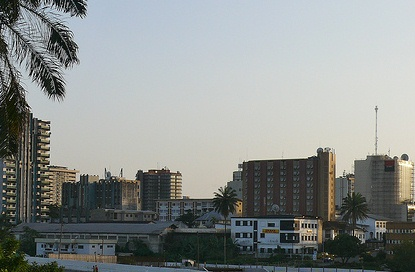
Douala City Centre

City	Region	Population (2012)
Bafoussam	West	301,900
Bamenda	Northwest	348,800
Buea	Southwest	119,000
Douala	Littoral	2,446,900
Garoua	North	296,900
Kumba	Southwest	173,000
Maroua	Far North	239,000
Ngaoundéré	Adamawa	195,600
Nkongsamba	Littoral	111,100
Yaoundé	Centre	2,440,100

== Canada ==
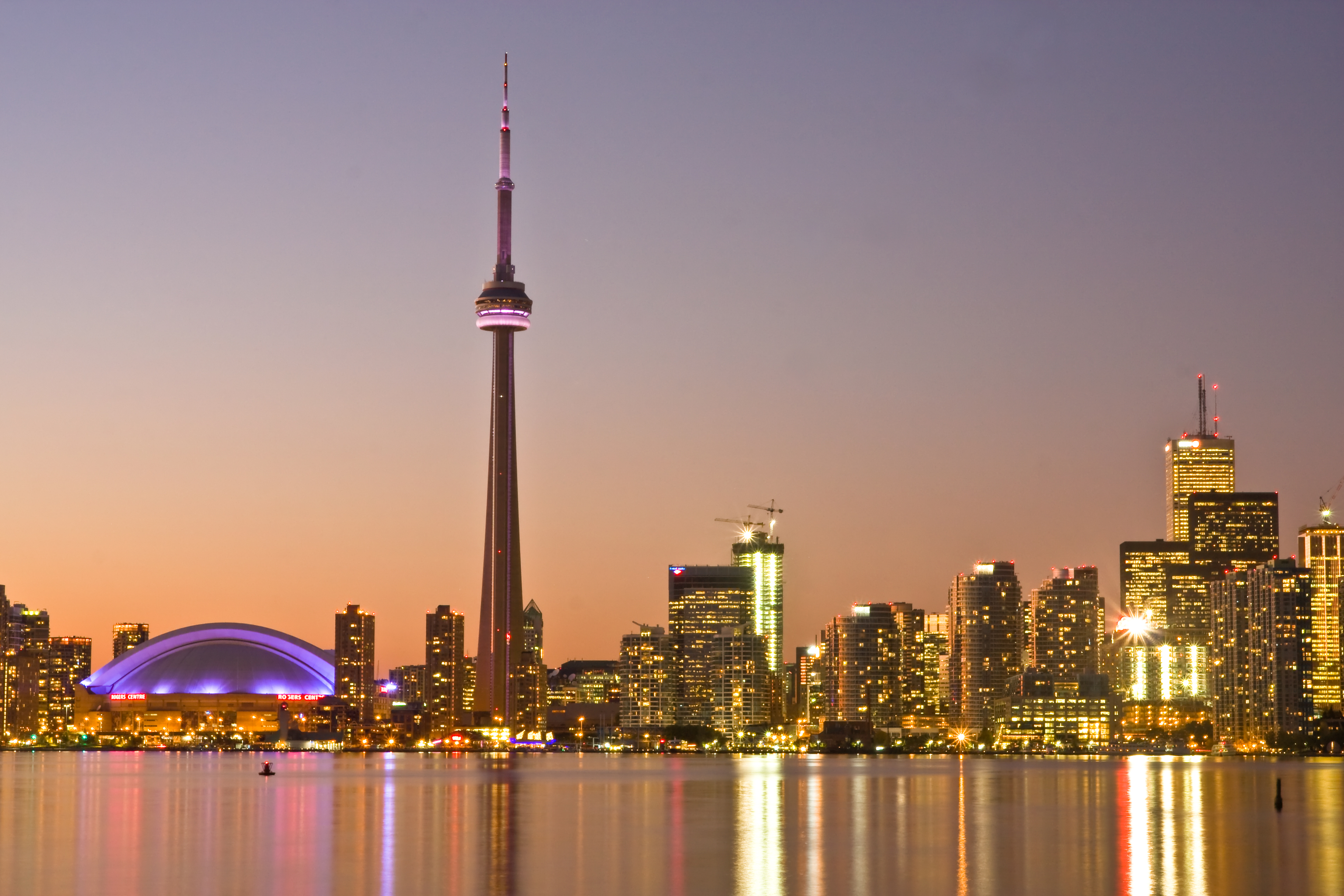
Toronto

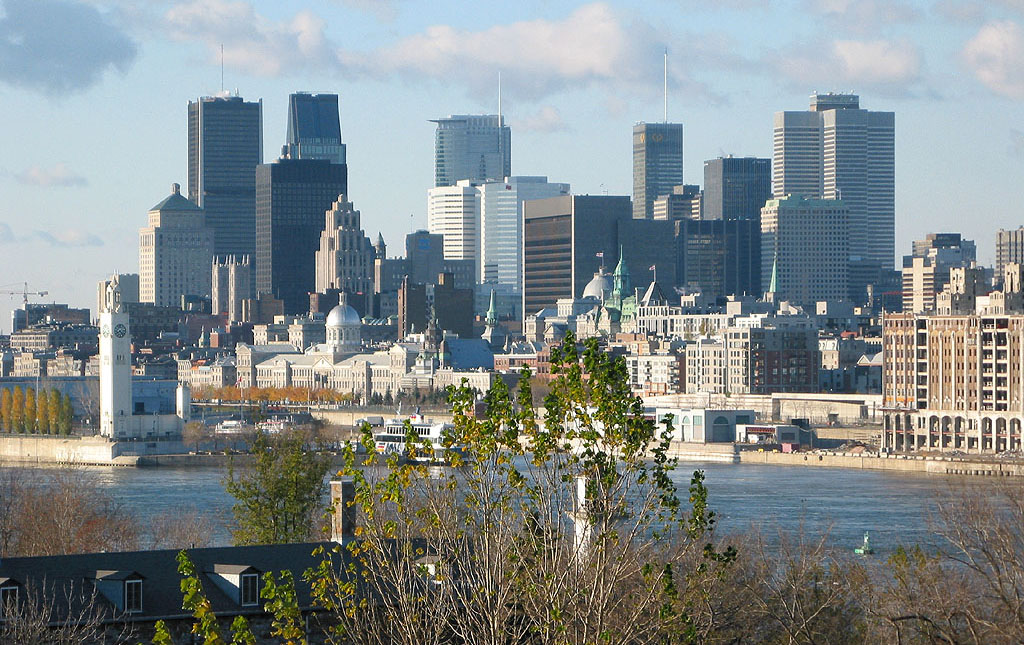
Montreal

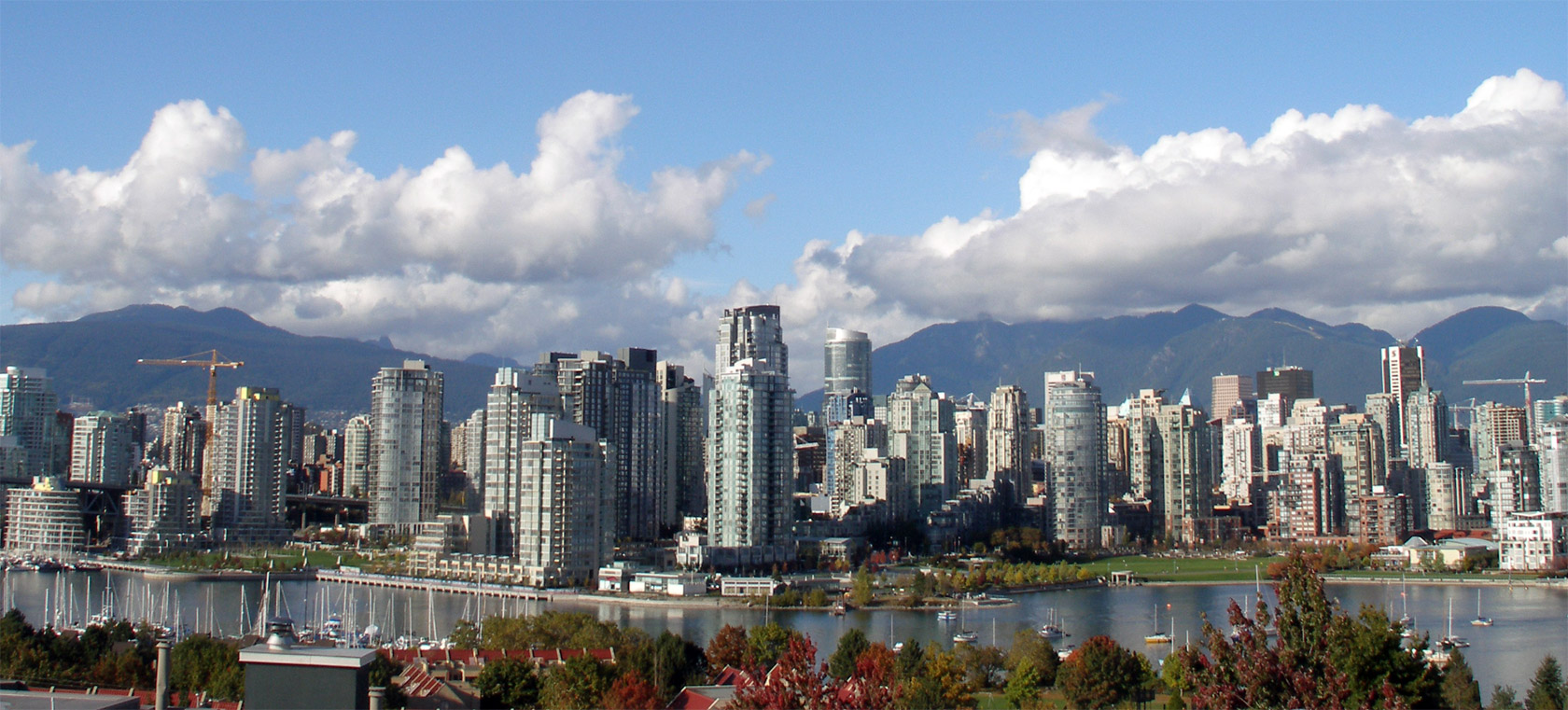
Vancouver

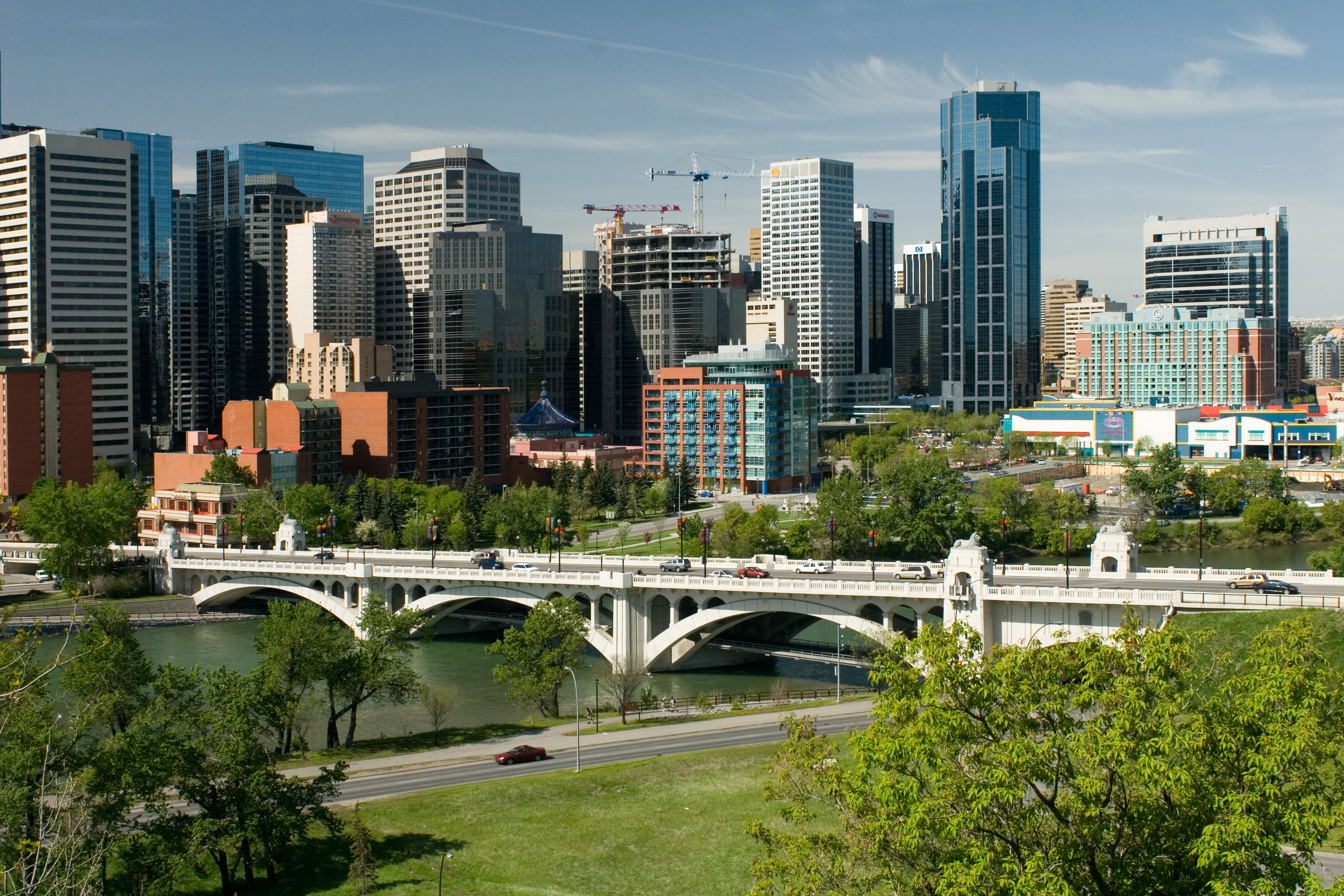
Calgary

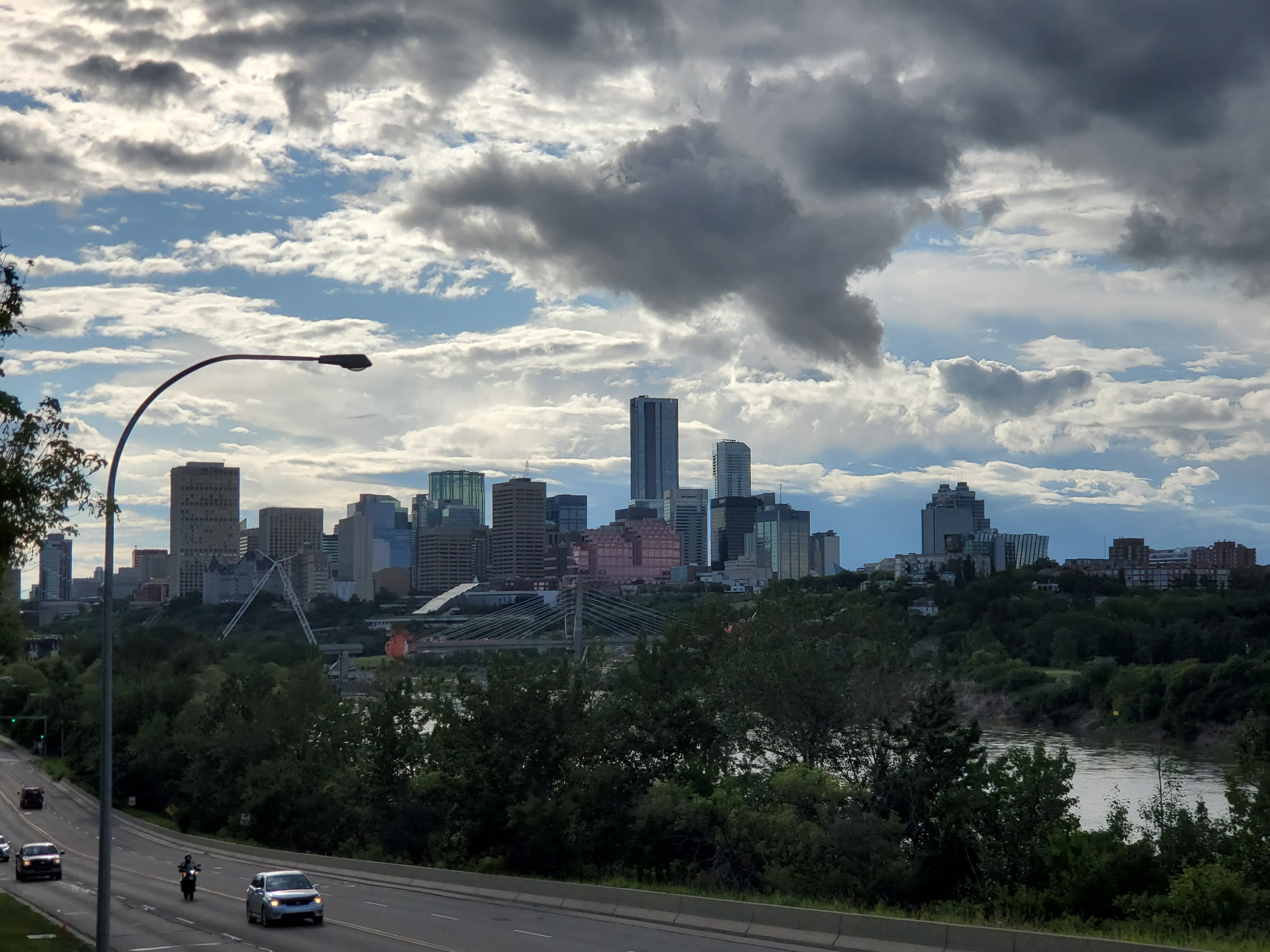
Edmonton

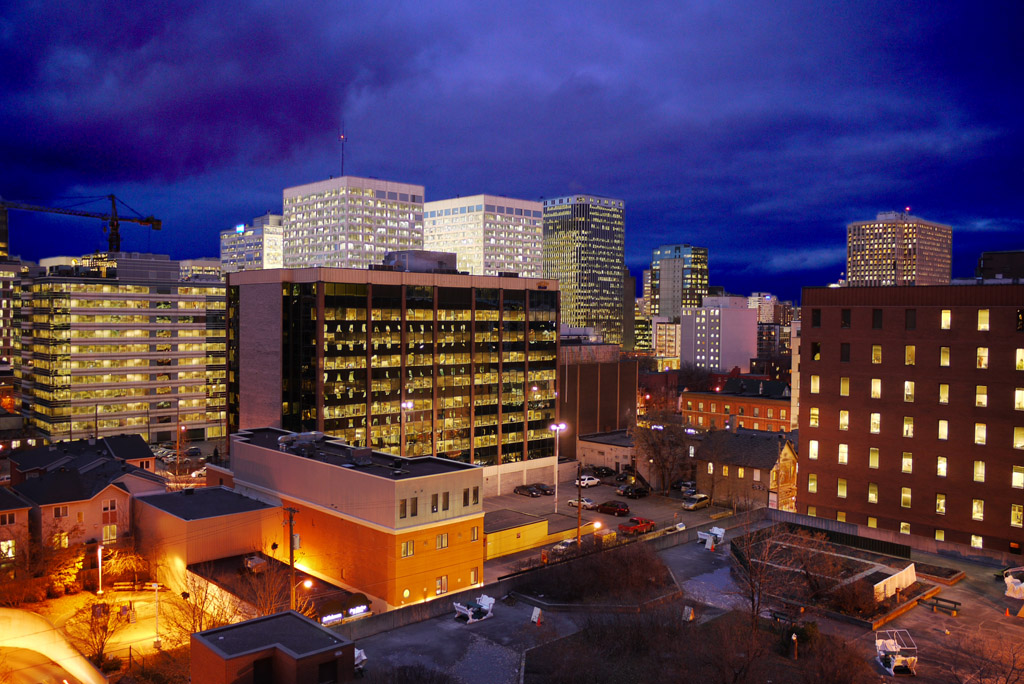
Ottawa, Capital of Canada

City	Province	Population (2021)
Toronto	Ontario	2,794,356
Montreal	Quebec	1,762,949
Calgary	Alberta	1,306,784
Ottawa	Ontario	1,017,449
Edmonton	Alberta	1,010,899
Winnipeg	Manitoba	749,607
Mississauga	Ontario	717,961
Vancouver	British Columbia	662,248
Brampton	Ontario	656,480
Hamilton	Ontario	569,353
Surrey	British Columbia	568,322
Quebec City	Quebec	549,459
Laval	Quebec	438,366
London	Ontario	422,324
Halifax	Nova Scotia	348,634
Markham	Ontario	338,503
Vaughan	Ontario	323,103
Gatineau	Quebec	291,041
Saskatoon	Saskatchewan	266,141
Kitchener	Ontario	256,885
Longueuil	Quebec	254,483
Burnaby	British Columbia	249,125
Windsor	Ontario	229,660
Regina	Saskatchewan	226,404
Oakville	Ontario	213,759
Richmond	British Columbia	209,937
Richmond Hill	Ontario	202,022
Burlington	Ontario	186,948
Oshawa	Ontario	175,383
Sherbrooke	Quebec	172,950
Greater Sudbury	Ontario	166,004
Abbotsford	British Columbia	153,524
Lévis	Quebec	149,683
Coquitlam	British Columbia	148,625
Barrie	Ontario	147,829
Saguenay	Quebec	144,723
Kelowna	British Columbia	144,576
Guelph	Ontario	143,740
Trois-Rivières	Quebec	139,163
Whitby	Ontario	138,501
Cambridge	Ontario	138,479
St. Catharines	Ontario	136,803
Milton	Ontario	132,979
Langley	British Columbia	132,603
Kingston	Ontario	132,485
Ajax	Ontario	126,666
Waterloo	Ontario	121,436
Terrebonne	Quebec	119,944
Saanich	British Columbia	117,735
St. John's	Newfoundland and Labrador	110,525
Thunder Bay	Ontario	108,843
Delta	British Columbia	108,455
Brantford	Ontario	104,688
Chatham-Kent	Ontario	103,988
Clarington	Ontario	101,427
Red Deer	Alberta	100,844

== Cape Verde ==
City	Municipality	Population (2021)
Praia	Praia	137,868

== Central African Republic ==
City	Prefecture	Population (2021)
Bangui	Bangui	812,407
Bimbo	Bangui	348,802
Bégoua	Bangui	264,067
Carnot	Mambéré	129,032
Berbérati	Mambéré-Kadéï	103,713

== Chad ==
City	Region	Population (2023)
N'Djamena	N'Djamena (capital)	1,592,324
Moundou	Logone Occidental	142,462

== Chile ==
City	Region	Population (2016)
Alto Hospicio	Tarapacá	118,400
Antofagasta	Antofagasta	382,800
Arica	Arica y Parinacota	225,800
Calama	Antofagasta	177,600
Chiguayante	Biobío	100,200
Chillán	Ñuble	159,300
Concepción	Biobío	221,100
Copiapó	Atacama	171,900
Coquimbo	Coquimbo	212,200
Coronel	Biobío	108,800
Curicó	Maule	103,200
Iquique	Tarapacá	195,500
La Serena	Coquimbo	202,100
Los Ángeles	Biobío	128,800
Osorno	Los Lagos	139,700
Puente Alto	Santiago Metropolitan	617,900
Puerto Montt	Los Lagos	210,000
Punta Arenas	Magallanes y Antártica Chilena	123,700
Quilpué	Valparaíso	169,300
Rancagua	O'Higgins	225,000
San Bernardo	Santiago Metropolitan	293,400
San Pedro de la Paz	Biobío	134,700
Santiago	Santiago Metropolitan	5,561,300
Talca	Maule	205,100
Talcahuano	Biobío	101,300
Temuco	Araucanía	225,700
Valdivia	Los Ríos	142,700
Valparaíso	Valparaíso	294,900
Villa Alemana	Valparaíso	141,000
Viña del Mar	Valparaíso	310,200

== China ==
City	Province	Population (2010)
Anshan	Liaoning	1,505,000
Anyang	Henan	908,100
Baoding	Hebei	1,257,800
Baoji	Shaanxi	871,900
Baotou	Inner Mongolia	1,900,400
Beijing	Beijing	16,704,300
Bengbu	Anhui	793,900
Benxi	Liaoning	1,000,100
Bozhou	Anhui	474,300
Changchun	Jilin	3,411,200
Changde	Hunan	848,300
Changsha	Hunan	3,193,400
Changshu	Jiangsu	929,100
Changzhi	Shanxi	848,200
Changzhou	Jiangsu	2,257,400
Chaozhou	Guangdong	1,256,300
Chengdu	Sichuan	7,823,800
Chifeng	Inner Mongolia	902,300
Chongqing	Chongqing	6,263,800
Cixi	Zhejiang	1,059,900
Dalian	Liaoning	3,902,500
Dandong	Liaoning	775,800
Daqing	Heilongjiang	1,433,700
Datong	Shanxi	1,420,500
Dazhou	Sichuan	678,700
Dongguan	Guangdong	7,271,300
Dongying	Shandong	773,500
Foshan	Guangdong	6,771,900
Fuling	Chongqing	595,200
Fuqing	Fujian	470,800
Fushun	Liaoning	1,318,800
Fuxin	Liaoning	750,300
Fuyang	Anhui	780,500
Fuzhou	Fujian	3,102,400
Ganzhou	Jiangxi	1,035,900
Guangzhou	Guangdong	10,641,400
Guilin	Guangxi	963,600
Guiyang	Guizhou	2,520,100
Harbin	Heilongjiang	4,596,300
Haikou	Hainan	1,517,400
Haining	Zhejiang	397,700
Handan	Hebei	1,173,200
Hangzhou	Zhejiang	5,849,500
Hechuan	Chongqing	721,800
Hefei	Anhui	3,098,700
Hengyang	Hunan	1,115,600
Hong Kong	Hong Kong	7,413,000
Huai'an	Jiangsu	1,523,700
Huaibei	Anhui	854,700
Huainan	Anhui	1,238,500
Huhehaote	Inner Mongolia	1,497,100
Huizhou	Guangdong	1,807,900
Huludao	Liaoning	646,500
Huzhou	Zhejiang	748,500
Jiangjin	Chongqing	686,200
Jiangmen	Guangdong	1,480,000
Jiangyin	Jiangsu	1,013,700
Jiaxing	Zhejiang	762,600
Jieyang	Guangdong	1,226,800
Jilin	Jilin	1,469,700
Jinan	Shandong	3,641,600
Jingzhou	Hubei	904,200
Jinhua	Zhejiang	710,600
Jining	Shandong	939,000
Jinjiang	Fujian	1,172,800
Jinzhou	Liaoning	946,100
Jixi	Heilongjiang	746,900
Kaifeng	Henan	894,100
Kunming	Yunnan	3,385,400
Kunshan	Jiangsu	1,118,600
Lanzhou	Gansu	2,438,600
Leshan	Sichuan	678,800
Lhasa	Tibet	220,300
Lianyungang	Jiangsu	897,400
Liaoyang	Liaoning	735,000
Linyi	Shandong	1,522,500
Liuzhou	Guangxi	1,624,600
Lu'an	Anhui	661,200
Luoyang	Henan	1,584,500
Luzhou	Sichuan	742,300
Ma'anshan	Anhui	657,800
Macau	Macau	682,000
Maoming	Guangdong	1,033,200
Mianyang	Sichuan	1,063,300
Mudanjiang	Heilongjiang	790,600
Nan'an	Fujian	718,500
Nanchang	Jiangxi	2,614,400
Nanchong	Sichuan	890,400
Nanjing	Jiangsu	5,827,900
Nanning	Guangxi	2,660,800
Nantong	Jiangsu	1,612,400
Nanyang	Henan	899,900
Ningbo	Zhejiang	2,583,100
Panjin	Liaoning	858,000
Pingdingshan	Henan	855,100
Puning	Guangdong	875,000
Putian	Fujian	1,107,200
Qingdao	Shandong	4,556,100
Qingyuan	Guangdong	916,200
Qinhuangdao	Hebei	967,900
Qiqiha'er	Heilongjiang	1,033,200
Quanzhou	Fujian	1,154,700
Rizhao	Shandong	902,300
Rui'an	Zhejiang	927,400
Shanghai	Shanghai	20,217,800
Shantou	Guangdong	3,644,000
Shaoguan	Guangdong	726,300
Shaoxing	Zhejiang	1,725,700
Shenyang	Liaoning	5,718,200
Shenzhen	Guangdong	10,358,400
Shijiazhuang	Hebei	3,095,200
Shiyan	Hubei	724,000
Suining	Sichuan	549,800
Suqian	Jiangsu	783,400
Suzhou	Anhui	742,700
Suzhou	Jiangsu	4,083,900
Tai'an	Shandong	1,123,500
Taiyuan	Shanxi	3,154,200
Taizhou	Zhejiang	1,189,300
Tangshan	Hebei	2,128,200
Tengzhou	Shandong	783,500
Tianjin	Tianjin	9,583,300
Tianshui	Gansu	544,400
Urumqi	Xinjiang	2,853,400
Wanzhou	Chongqing	859,700
Weifang	Shandong	1,261,600
Weihai	Shandong	2,804,771
Wenling	Zhejiang	749,000
Wenzhou	Zhejiang	2,686,800
Wuhan	Hubei	7,541,500
Wuhu	Anhui	1,108,100
Wuxi	Jiangsu	2,757,700
Xiamen	Fujian	3,119,100
Xi'an	Shaanxi	5,850,000
Xiangtan	Hunan	903,300
Xiangyang	Hubei	1,433,100
Xianyang	Shaanxi	685,900
Xiaogan	Hubei	582,400
Xining	Qinghai	1,227,200
Xinxiang	Henan	918,100
Xuzhou	Jiangsu	2,214,800
Yancheng	Jiangsu	1,136,800
Yangjiang	Guangdong	692,500
Yangzhou	Jiangsu	1,584,200
Yantai	Shandong	1,797,900
Yibin	Sichuan	708,400
Yichang	Hubei	1,049,400
Yinchuan	Ningxia	1,159,500
Yiwu	Zhejiang	878,900
Yongchuan	Chongqing	582,800
Yueqing	Zhejiang	726,000
Yueyang	Hunan	924,100
Yuyao	Zhejiang	672,900
Zaozhuang	Shandong	980,900
Zhangjiagang	Jiangsu	762,600
Zhangjiakou	Hebei	1,180,700
Zhangzhou	Fujian	614,700
Zhanjiang	Guangdong	1,038,800
Zhaoqing	Guangdong	784,600
Zhengzhou	Henan	3,677,000
Zhenjiang	Jiangsu	950,500
Zhongshan	Guangdong	2,741,000
Zhuhai	Guangdong	1,369,500
Zhuji	Zhejiang	606,700
Zhuzhou	Hunan	1,093,700
Zibo	Shandong	2,261,700
Zigong	Sichuan	666,200
Zunyi	Guizhou	995,300

== Colombia ==
City	Department	Population (2023)
Aguachica	Cesar	124,553
Apartadó	Antioquía	133,811
Arauca	Arauca	101,457
Armenia	Quindío	316,926
Barrancabermeja	Santander	216,219
Barranquilla	Atlántico	1,327,209
Bello	Antioquía	578,376
Bogotá	Distrito Capital	7,968,095
Bucaramanga	Santander	623,378
Buenaventura	Valle del Cauca	318,003
Buga	Valle del Cauca	131,499
Cajicá	Cundinamarca	102,554
Cali	Valle del Cauca	2,297,230
Cartagena	Bolívar	1,065,570
Cartago	Valle del Cauca	140,022
Cereté	Córdoba	110,723
Chía	Cundinamarca	164,995
Ciénaga	Magdalena	128,647
Cúcuta	Norte de Santander	795,608
Dosquebradas	Risaralda	230,806
Duitama	Boyacá	129,192
Envigado	Antioquia	253,699
Facatativá	Cundinamarca	172,064
Florencia	Caquetá	178,640
Floridablanca	Santander	315,981
Funza	Cundinamarca	115,923
Fusagasugá	Cundinamarca	170,039
Girardot	Cundinamarca	121,090
Girón	Santander	176,418
Ibagué	Tolima	545,210
Ipiales	Nariño	116,074
Itagüí	Antioquia	303,766
Jamundí	Valle del Cauca	170,492
Lorica	Córdoba	117,924
Madrid	Cundinamarca	140,249
Magangué	Bolívar	145,145
Maicao	La Guajira	194,675
Malambo	Atlántico	145,396
Manizales	Caldas	458,422
Medellín	Antioquía	2,653,729
Montería	Córdoba	516,217
Mosquera	Cundinamarca	166,203
Neiva	Huila	373,129
Ocaña	Norte de Santander	132,387
Palmira	Valle del Cauca	361,375
Pasto	Nariño	393,476
Pereira	Risaralda	490,464
Piedecuesta	Santander	187,763
Pitalito	Huila	131,735
Popayán	Cauca	333,382
Quibdó	Chocó	133,906
Riohacha	La Guajira	212,314
Rionegro	Antioquía	149,786
Sabanalarga	Atlántico	104,207
Sahagún	Córdoba	112,585
Santa Marta	Magdalena	557,388
Santander de Quilichao	Cauca	115,745
Sincelejo	Sucre	304,026
Soacha	Cundinamarca	831,259
Sogamoso	Boyacá	133,716
Soledad	Atlántico	692,799
Tuluá	Valle del Cauca	223,191
Tumaco	Nariño	257,631
Tunja	Boyacá	182,828
Turbo	Antioquía	136,374
Uribia	La Guajira	199,987
Valledupar	Cesar	559,462
Villa del Rosario	Norte de Santander	113,903
Villavicencio	Meta	558,299
Yopal	Casanare	181,548
Yumbo	Valle del Cauca	112,272
Zipaquirá	Cundinamarca	161,445

== Congo, Democratic Republic ==
City	Province	Population (2004)
Bandundu	Kwilu	117,200
Boma	Kongo Central	171,600
Bukavu	South Kivu	471,800
Bunia	Ituri	230,600
Butembo	North Kivu	404,400
Gandajika	Lomami	120,200
Gemena	Sud-Ubangi	113,900
Goma	North Kivu	249,900
Isiro	Haut-Uélé	147,500
Kabinda	Lomami	126,700
Kamina	Haut-Lomami	115,600
Kananga	Kasaï-Central	720,400
Kikwit	Kwilu	264,200
Kindu	Maniema	135,500
Kinshasa	Kinshasa	7,273,900
Kisangani	Tshopo	682,600
Kolwezi	Lualaba	456,400
Likasi	Haut-Katanga	367,200
Lubumbashi	Haut-Katanga	1,283,400
Matadi	Kongo Central	245,900
Mbandaka	Équateur	262,800
Mbuji-Mayi	Kasaï-Oriental	1,213,700
Mwene-Ditu	Lomami	170,800
Tshikapa	Kasaï	366,500
Uvira	South Kivu	235,100

== Congo, Republic ==
City	Department	Population (2023)
Brazzaville	Brazzaville	2,138,236
Pointe-Noire	Pointe-Noire	1,398,812
Dolisie	Niari	178,172
Nkayi	Bouenza	104,083

== Costa Rica ==
City	Province	Population (2020)
San José	San José	347,398
Alajuela	Alajuela	224,274
Desamparados	San José	194,970
Cartago	Cartago	131,168
Heredia	Heredia	123,255
Goicoechea	San José	113,399

== Croatia ==
City	County	Population (2022)
Zagreb	Grad Zagreb	768,624
Split	Split-Dalmatia	159,008
Rijeka	Primorje-Gorski Kotar	106,579

== Cuba ==
City	Province	Population (2019)
Bayamo	Granma	239,225
Camagüey	Camagüey	332,427
Cárdenas	Matanzas	158,112
Ciego de Ávila	Ciego de Ávila	156,571
Cienfuegos	Cienfuegos	177,958
Contramaestre	Santiago de Cuba	105,370
Guantánamo	Guantánamo	225,699
Havana	La Habana	2,132,394
Holguín	Holguín	356,942
Manzanillo	Granma	127,167
Matanzas	Matanzas	163,568
Palma Soriano	Santiago de Cuba	121,943
Pinar del Río	Pinar del Río	192,776
Sancti Spíritus	Sancti Spíritus	143,252
Santa Clara	Villa Clara	246,871
Santiago de Cuba	Santiago de Cuba	509,841
Las Tunas	Las Tunas	212,732

== Curaçao ==
Name	Population (2011)
Willemstad	136,660

== Cyprus ==
City	District	Population (2011)
Nicosia	Nicosia	106,850
Lemesos	Limassol	101,000

== Czech Republic ==
City	Region	Population (2023)
Brno	South Moravian	396,101
Liberec	Liberec	107,389
Olomouc	Olomouc	101,825
Ostrava	Moravian-Silesian	283,504
Plzeň	Plzeň	181,240
Prague	Prague	1,357,326

== Denmark ==
City	Region	Population (2024)
Copenhagen	Capital	659,350
Aarhus	Central	343,533
Aalborg	North Jutland	204,901
Odense	Southern	199,682
Esbjerg	Southern	105,229
Frederiksberg	Capital	104,899

== Djibouti ==
City	Region	Population (2024)
Djibouti	Djibouti	776,966

== Dominican Republic ==
City	Province	Population (2016)
Azua	Azua	102,300
Bajos de Haina	San Cristóbal	143,800
Baní	Peravia	177,600
Boca Chica	Santo Domingo	122,200
Bonao	Monseñor Nouel	148,900
Higüey	La Altagracia	211,500
La Romana	La Romana	152,500
La Vega	La Vega	273,500
Los Alcarrizos	Santo Domingo	249,600
Moca	Espaillat	182,800
Puerto Plata	Puerto Plata	156,100
San Cristóbal	San Cristóbal	276,800
San Francisco de Macoris	Duarte	185,900
San Juan de la Maguana	San Juan	137,900
San Pedro de Macorís	San Pedro de Macorís	233,300
Santiago de los Caballeros	Santiago	757,900
Santo Domingo	Santo Domingo	1,126,300
Santo Domingo Este	Santo Domingo	966,400
Santo Domingo Norte	Santo Domingo	453,000
Santo Domingo Oeste	Santo Domingo	349,200

== East Timor ==
City	Municipality	Population (2022)
Dili	Dili	267,623

== Ecuador ==
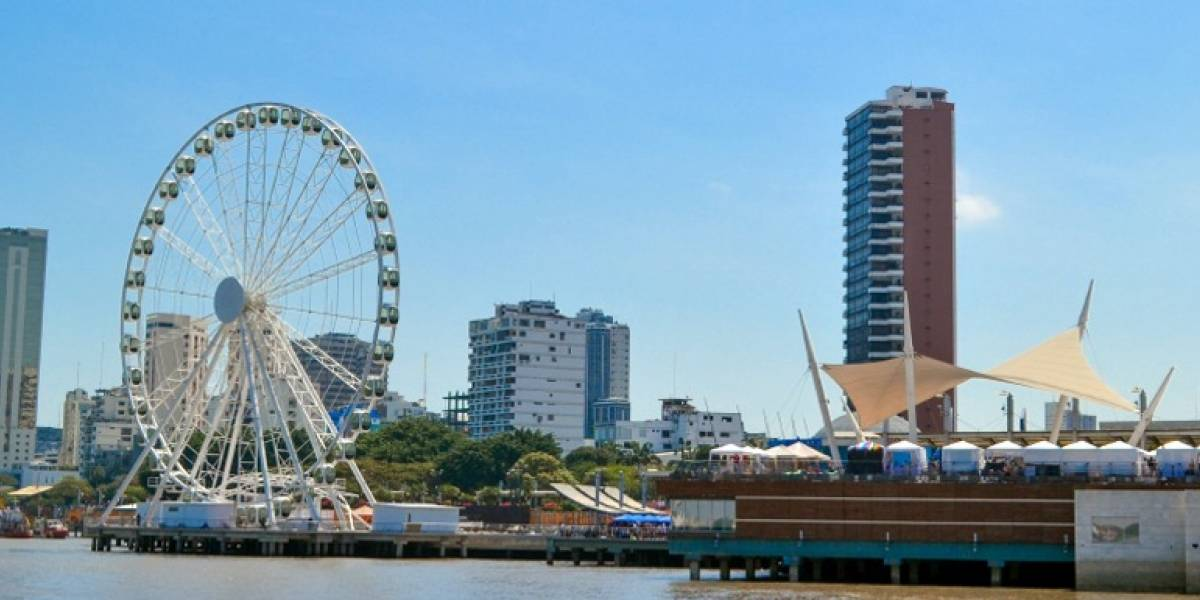
Guayaquil

City	Province	Population (2016)
Ambato	Tungurahua	176,900
Babahoyo	Los Rios	100,400
Cuenca	Azuay	383,400
Durán	Guayas	280,000
Esmeraldas	Esmeraldas	188,600
Guayaquil	Guayas	2,531,400
Ibarra	Imbabura	153,800
La Libertad	Santa Elena	110,400
Loja	Loja	214,100
Machala	El Oro	260,200
Manta	Manabí	244,700
Milagro	Guayas	150,400
Portoviejo	Manabí	232,500
Quevedo	Los Rios	175,000
Quito	Pichincha	1,778,400
Riobamba	Chimborazo	164,500
Santo Domingo de los Colorados	Santo Domingo de los Tsáchilas	321,100

== Egypt ==
City	Governorate	Population (2024)
Cairo	Cairo	10,299,821
Alexandria	Alexandria	5,388,367
Giza	Giza	4,481,951
Shubra El Kheima	Qalyubiya	1,285,687
Suez	Suez	797,045
Port Said	Port Said	684,457
Mansoura	Dakahlia	633,117
El Mahalla El Kubra	Gharbia	618,517
Tanta	Gharbia	601,888
Asyut	Asyut	570,412
Faiyum	Faiyum	534,057
Khusus	Qalyubiya	506,800
Zagazig	Sharqia	466,970
Ismailia	Ismailia	455,740
Aswan	Aswan	406,842
6th of October	Giza	378,306
Damanhur	Beheira	332,073
Damietta	Damietta	314,585
Minya	Minya	301,804
Beni Suef	Beni Suef	300,131
Luxor	Luxor	289,618
Sohag	Sohag	282,357
Shibin El Kom	Monufia	280,765
Qena	Qena	267,759
10th of Ramadan	Sharqia	267,015
Mallawi	Minya	226,270
Hurghada	Red Sea	215,950
Arish	North Sinai	205,861
Bilbeis	Sharqia	200,949
Kafr El Sheikh	Kafr El Sheikh	198,911
Mersa Matruh	Matrouh	197,925
Benha	Qalyubiya	188,940
Edku	Beheira	184,872
Abu Kebir	Sharqia	167,565
El Matareya	Dakahlia	164,946
Qalyub	Qalyubiya	162,090
Akhmim	Sohag	160,168
Girga	Sohag	159,981
El Hawamdeya	Giza	159,123
Mit Ghamr	Dakahlia	156,513
Desouk	Kafr El Sheikh	152,623
Samalut	Minya	151,120
Nasser	Beni Suef	149,916
Obour	Qalyubiya	144,074
Tahta	Sohag	142,065
Kerdasa	Giza	141,197
Belqas	Dakahlia	139,543
Sinnuris	Faiyum	137,390
Kafr El Dawwar	Beheira	134,141
Menouf	Monufia	131,717
Rosetta	Beheira	131,260
Ashmoun	Monufia	130,430
El Manzala	Dakahlia	129,680
Manfalut	Asyut	127,236
Faqous	Sharqia	126,868
El Senbellawein	Dakahlia	126,245
Maghagha	Minya	125,812
Kom Ombo	Aswan	124,581
El Fashn	Beni Suef	124,159
Beni Mazar	Minya	123,185
Abnub	Asyut	120,609
Zefta	Gharbia	116,587
Talkha	Dakahlia	114,881
Abu Tij	Asyut	113,741
Dairut	Asyut	110,672
Port Fuad	Port Said	109,519
Minya al Qamh	Sharqia	107,708
El Quseyia	Asyut	107,465
Tima	Sohag	106,966
Esna	Luxor	104,377
Biba	Beni Suef	104,028
Dekernes	Dakahlia	102,897
El Qurein	Sharqia	102,660
El Gamaliya	Dakahlia	101,426

== El Salvador ==
City	Department	Population (2007)
San Salvador	San Salvador	316,090
Soyapango	San Salvador	241,403
Santa Ana	Santa Ana	204,340
San Miguel	San Miguel	158,136
Mejicanos	San Salvador	140,751
Apopa	San Salvador	131,286
Delgado	San Salvador	112,161
Santa Tecla	La Libertad	108,840
Ilopango	San Salvador	103,862

== Equatorial Guinea ==
City	Province	Population (2001)
Malabo	Bioko Norte	132,440
Bata	Litoral	132,235

== Eritrea ==
City	Region	Population (1997)
Asmara	Central	380,568

== Estonia ==
City	County	Population (2021)
Tallinn	Harju	437,817

== Ethiopia ==
City	Region/City	Population (2022)
Addis Ababa	Addis Ababa	3,859,999
Hawassa	Sidama	555,480
Dire Dawa	Dire Dawa	535,000
Gondar	Amhara	465,973
Mekelle	Tigray	457,917
Adama	Oromia	456,868
Bahir Dar	Amhara	455,901
Dessie	Amhara	307,638
Harar	Harari	276,000
Jimma	Oromia	250,909
Shashamane	Oromia	208,368
Bishoftu	Oromia	207,383
Sodo	Southern	204,121
Arba Minch	Southern	201,049
Jijiga	Somali	198,000
Hosaena	Central	188,192
Kombolcha	Amhara	164,140
Dila	Southern	158,795
Nekemte	Oromia	156,004
Debre Birhan	Amhara	146,918
Debre Markos	Amhara	140,699
Asella	Oromia	139,537
Debre Tabor	Amhara	125,312
Burayu	Oromia	122,397
Adigrat	Tigray	121,776
Weldiya	Amhara	104,005
Shire Inda Selassie	Tigray	100,079

== Fiji ==
City	Province	Population (2017)
Suva	Rewa, Naitasiri	185,913

== Finland ==
City	Region	Population (2023)
Helsinki	Uusimaa	674,963
Espoo	Uusimaa	314,152
Tampere	Pirkanmaa	255,066
Vantaa	Uusimaa	247,447
Oulu	North Ostrobothnia	214,651
Turku	Southwest Finland	201,889
Jyväskylä	Central Finland	147,821
Kuopio	Northern Savonia	124,011
Lahti	Päijänne Tavastia	120,693

== France ==
City	Region	Population (2021)
Aix-en-Provence	Provence-Alpes-Côte d'Azur	147,478
Amiens	Hauts-de-France	133,625
Angers	Pays de la Loire	157,175
Annecy	Auvergne-Rhône-Alpes	131,715
Argenteuil	Île-de-France	107,221
Besançon	Bourgogne-Franche-Comté	119,198
Bordeaux	Nouvelle-Aquitaine	261,804
Boulogne-Billancourt	Île-de-France	119,808
Brest	Brittany	139,619
Caen	Normandy	108,200
Clermont-Ferrand	Auvergne-Rhône-Alpes	147,327
Dijon	Bourgogne-Franche-Comté	159,346
Grenoble	Auvergne-Rhône-Alpes	157,477
Le Havre	Normandy	166,058
Lille	Hauts-de-France	236,710
Limoges	Nouvelle-Aquitaine	129,760
Lyon	Auvergne-Rhône-Alpes	522,250
Le Mans	Pays de la Loire	145,004
Marseille	Provence-Alpes-Côte d'Azur	873,076
Metz	Grand Est	120,874
Montpellier	Occitania	302,454
Montreuil	Île-de-France	111,455
Mulhouse	Grand Est	106,341
Nancy	Grand Est	104,260
Nantes	Pays de la Loire	323,204
Nice	Provence-Alpes-Côte d'Azur	348,085
Nîmes	Occitania	148,104
Orléans	Centre-Val de Loire	116,617
Paris	Île-de-France	2,133,111
Perpignan	Occitania	119,656
Reims	Grand Est	179,380
Rennes	Brittany	225,081
Rouen	Normandy	114,083
Saint-Denis	Île-de-France	113,942
Saint-Étienne	Auvergne-Rhône-Alpes	172,718
Strasbourg	Grand Est	291,313
Toulon	Provence-Alpes-Côte d'Azur	180,452
Toulouse	Occitania	504,078
Tours	Centre-Val de Loire	137,658
Villeurbanne	Auvergne-Rhône-Alpes	156,928

== See also ==
- World largest cities
