= Hamada Helal =

Egyptian singer, composer and actor (born 1980)

- حمادة هلال
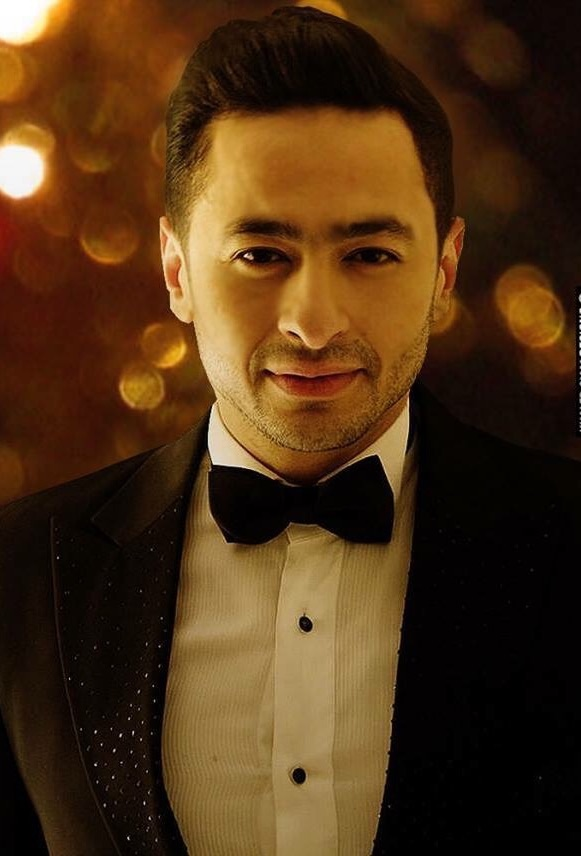
- Born: Mohamed Abdel-Fatah Mohamed Abdulaziz Helal محمد عبد الفتاح محمد عبد العزيز هلال; March 20, 1980 (age 46); Faqous, Sharqia Egypt
- Other name: Safir El-Qolob
- Occupations: Singer; actor; composer
- Years active: 1994–present
- Spouse: Asma Samih (m. 2008)
- Children: 2 Rama, Youssef
- Musical career
- Genres: World music; Egyptian music
- Instruments: Vocals

Mohamed Abdel-Fatah Mohamed Abdulaziz Helal (Arabic: محمد عبد الفتاح محمد عبد العزيز هلال; born March 20, 1980), better known as Hamada Helal (حمادة هلال), is an Egyptian singer, actor, and composer who was born in Faqous, Sharqia Governorate, Egypt. He now resides in Cairo. Hamada started his interest singing when he was 5 years old. He used to record his voice whilst singing on cassette tapes. Helal has presented several albums and has presented work in cinema and television. Hamada Helal is regarded as one of Egypt and the Middle East's prominent singers. His successful music career eventually led him to pursue acting. He is particularly recognized for his television roles in the 2019 series Ibn Osool, the 2018 series Qanon Omar, and the 2017 series Taqat Alqadr.

Helal has also appeared in several films, including Hamaty Bet-hebbeny (2014), Mr. and Mrs. Oweis (2012), Amn Dawlat (2011), Helm El Omr (2008), El Hob Kedah (2007), Eleyal Herbit (2006), and Eyal Habiba (2005).

== Early life ==
Hamada Helal's real name is "Mohamed Abdel Fattah Mohamed Abdel Aziz Helal". Born in Sharqia Governorate, he and his family, consisting of a brother "Medhat", and two sisters "Hind" and "Nour" moved to Cairo in the Al-Zawia Al-Hamra area. Helal started singing when he was 5 years old. He used to record his voice whilst singing on cassette tapes. Many artists influenced Hamada, such as Abdel Halim Hafez, Mohamed Abdel Wahab and Umm Kulthum. At school, He sang during school breaks and entertainment periods. His relatives noticed the beauty of his voice, so they asked him to sing at weddings and birthdays. When Helal was seven, one of his relatives heard him singing and took him to a musician. He learned the music basics and was encouraged. The musician told Helal that he would introduce him to sing at his relatives' wedding. This was the starting point of his career. He worked from an early age in various professions while his studies and music career to contribute to the livelihood of his family, which was going through difficult financial circumstances. He joined the Faculty of Tourism and Hotels in 1997.

== Career ==
=== Beginnings and breakthrough years (1996–2005) ===
Helal met the artist Hassan Esh Ish, who after hearing his singing introduced him to, which made him introduce him to the artist Hamid Al Shaeri, who in turn introduced him to those in charge of a recording company. His launch was through a cocktail album released by High Quality, among many young talents; its success led to the producing company encouraged to release an album in 1996 called Al-Ayyam, and within eight songs. At the time of the release of Al-Ayyam, he was 16 years old. This album won the approval of the public at the time, and achieved wide success. Al-Ayyam was an entry visa for Hamada Hilal to the world of fame, as he achieved more than 150,000 copies of sales, after which he presented albums such as Dar Al-Zaman in 1998, and Domoaa in 2000. Bakhaf, his fourth album, was released in 2002, followed by his fifth album Waheshni in 2004.

=== Film appearances (2005 onwards) ===
Helal made his film debut in the movie Eial Habiba (Lover Boys) in 2005. One year later he made another appearance in El Eial Herbet (The Boys Escaped) as one of the main characters Hassan. In the movie he sang 3 songs: Azza, Kan lazim, and Mastool. In 2007 Hamada Helal starred in the movie El Hob keda (This is love) acting as one of the main characters Seif. He sang one of his most famous songs Lama Betelmisny (When You Touch Me) which would later be added to his 2008 album Bahebak Akher Haja, in that same year Hamada starred in the movie Helm Elomar (Dream of a lifetime) in which he acted as the role of a boxer who wanted to reach the world championship. In 2011, he appeared in the movie Amn Dawlat (State Security) in which he played the role of state security officer followed by 2012 movie Mr. & Mrs Oweis. He also released his album Matkoulahash in that same year. Then he appeared in 2014 movie Hamati Bithibbeni (My Mother-in-law Loves Me) where he portrayed the role of plastic surgeon who himself undergoes psychological treatment. And then followed by his appearance as a con man in 2017 movie Shantet Hamza (Hamza's Bag).

=== Television roles ===
Helal acted as leading role in television series Taqat AlQadr (2017) and Qanon Omar (2018).

Helal was cast as leading role in a successful tv series Al Maddah (2021–2026) The show produced six seasons. Despite the success there were some critics who accused the show of superstition and sorcery, in Helal responded to critics stating 'El-Maddah' doesn't promote superstition, sorcery.

== Personal life ==
Helal married the Palestinian "Asmaa Samih" in 2009, and they have two children, a daughter named Rama Helal and a son Youssef Helal.

== Discography ==
Albums
Year	Title
1996	Al-Ayam
1998	Dar El Zaman
2000	Demoaa
2002	Bakhaf
2004	Waheshni
2005	Eial Habiba
2008	Bahebak Akher Haja
2012	Matolhash
2017	Eish Basha

== Filmography ==
Films
Year	Title	Role	Notes
2005	Eial Habiba	Eid	
2006	El Eial Herbet	Hassan	
2007	El Hob Keda	Seif	
2008	Helm Elomr	Ahmed	
2011	Amn Dawlat	Hossam/Afifi	
2012	Mr. & Mrs Oweis	Ahmed Oweis	
2014	Hamati Bithibbeni	Sherif Mortada	
2017	Shantet Hamza	Hamza/Kim Polley	

Television
Year	Title	Role	Notes
1999	Badara	Haroun	
2015	Waly Al-Aahd	Khaled	
2017	Taqat AlQadr	Abdullah	
2018	Qanon Omar	Omar	
2019	Ibn Osool	Hesham	
2021–2026	Al-Maddah	Saber Al-Maddah	

== Awards ==
=== Music ===
- A regional ceremony awarded him as Best Egyptian Singer. Reward is called Best Singer of 2025.
- Earned best Arab single song for men "Bein Idek" (In your Arms) during the ART music, film and TV awards event.
- Nominated for the Revelation of African Continent award.

=== Acting ===
- Awarded winner of lead actor in (2025) by DearGuest Excellence Award for his role in Al Maddah at the 19th DG Awards.
