= El Ibrahimiya =

El Ibrahimiya الأبراهيمية
- Town
- Location in Egypt
- Coordinates: 30.719092°N 31.561275°E
- Country: Egypt
- Governorate: Sharqia

Area
  - Total: 13.6 km^{2} (5.3 sq mi)
- Elevation: 23 m (75 ft)

Population (2023)
  - Total: 57,546
  - Density: 4,230/km^{2} (11,000/sq mi)
- Time zone: UTC+2 (EET)
  - Summer (DST): UTC+3 (EEST)

El Ibrahimiya (Arabic: الأبراهيمية) is a town and markaz in the Sharqia Governorate, Egypt. The town had a population of 57,546, while the whole markaz had a population of 201,910 according to 2023 estimates. The city is named after Ibrahim Pasha of Egypt and has grown out of an agricultural village.

== Geography ==
The city is located in the Nile Delta within the Sharqia Governorate. It lies north of Zagazig and Hihya and is surrounded by agricultural land.

== Climate ==
Köppen-Geiger climate classification system classifies its climate as hot desert (BWh).

== See also ==
- List of cities and towns in Egypt
