= Abd Allah al-Sharqawi =

Egyptian writer and scholar of the Khalwati sufi order

Abd Allah ibn Hijazi al-Sharqawi
- Born: 1737; At Tawilah, Faqous, Sharqia Governorate, Egypt Eyalet
- Died: 1812 (aged 74–75)
- Occupations: Rector of al-Azhar, Head of Khalwati Sufi order, Shafi'i Scholar

Sheikh Abdullah al-Sharqawi (Arabic: عبد الله الشرقاوي) (1737 – 1812) was an Egyptian writer and scholar of the Khalwati sufi order. He was known for being the Grand Imam of al-Azhar during the French Campaign in Egypt and Syria, and for being one of the Leaders of the resistance against the French Occupation in Egypt, he was also one of the Three Leaders to crown Mehmet Ali Pasha in 1805.

== French expedition ==
During Napoleon's exile at St. Helena, and when writing his diaries, he states that the al-Azhar University is as equal if not more, than the Sorbonne in Paris. Napoleon looked highly upon al-Azhar Ulama as the elite of the educated class and as the leaders of the people. When he first set foot in Cairo he formed a special council (diwan) to govern the capital. Council that consisted of nine Sheikhs under the chairmanship of Sheikh Abdullah al-Sharqawi, the Grand Imam of Al-Azhar at that time. The formation of this council stands as an evidences of the importance of al-Azhar and the high status of its Imams.

== See also ==
- List of Ash'aris
- List of Muslim theologians

Sunni Islam titles
Preceded by Ahmad al-Arusi	Grand Imam of Al-Azhar; 1793 – 1812	Succeeded by Muhammad al-Shanawani
