= Faruq Selim =

Egyptian gymnast

- فاروق علي سليم السيد
- Full name: Faruq 'Ali Selim El-Sayed
- Born: 1936 (age 89–90) Diyarb Negm, Kingdom of Egypt

Gymnastics career
- Discipline: Men's artistic gymnastics
- Country represented: United Arab Republic
Medal record
Men's artistic gymnastics
Representing United Arab Republic
Mediterranean Games
Gold medal – first place	1959 Beirut	Team

Faruq 'Ali Selim El-Sayed (born 1936) is an Egyptian gymnast. He competed in eight events at the 1960 Summer Olympics.
