= Muhammad A. S. Abdel Haleem =

Egyptian Islamic studies scholar (born 1933)

Muhammad A. S. Abdel-Haleem OBE, FCIL
- محمد عبد الحليم سعيد
- Born: 1933 (age 92–93); Abu Hammad, Kingdom of Egypt
- Occupation: Professor of Islamic Studies

Academic background
- Education: Al-Azhar University University of Cairo, Dar al-Ulum University of Cambridge

Academic work
- Discipline: Islamic studies
- Sub-discipline: Qur'anic Studies
- Main interests: Qur'anic Studies
- Notable works: The Qur'an: A New Translation (2004-16)

Muhammad A. S. Abdel Haleem (Arabic: محمد عبد الحليم سعيد) is an Egyptian Islamic studies scholar and the King Fahd Professor of Islamic Studies at SOAS University of London. He is the editor of the Journal of Qur'anic Studies.

== Biography ==
Born in Al-Isdiyya, a village in Abu Hammad in Egypt in 1933, Abdel Haleem learned the Quran by heart during his childhood. He studied at Al-Azhar University and completed his PhD at the University of Cambridge. He has lectured at SOAS since 1971. In 2004, Oxford University Press published his translation of the Quran into English. He has also published several other works in this field.

Abdel Haleem was appointed an Order of the British Empire (OBE) in Elizabeth II's 2008 Birthday Honours in recognition of his services to Arabic culture, literature, and inter-faith understanding.

== Works ==
- 2006 with Robinson, Danielle (eds.), The Moral World of the Qur'an, London: IB Tauris.
- 2006 "Islam, Religion of the Environment" in Cotran, E. and Lau, M. (eds.), Yearbook of Islamic and Middle Eastern Law, Netherlands: E.J. Brill, pp. 403–410.
- 2006 "Arabic and Islam" in Brown, Keith (ed.), Encyclopedia of Language and Linguistics, Oxford: Elsevier, pp. 34–37.
- 2006 "Qur'an and Hadith" in Winter, Tim (ed.), The Cambridge Companion to Classical Islamic Theology, UK: Cambridge University Press.
- 2005 with Badawi, Elsaid M., Dictionary of Qur'anic Usage, E. J. Brill.
- 2004 The Qur'an: a New Translation, Oxford, UK: Oxford University Press (Oxford World's Classics Hardcovers Series).
- 2002 "The Prophet Muhammad as a Teacher: implications for Hadith literature" in Islamic Quarterly vol. XLVI (2), pp. 121–137.
- 1999 Understanding the Qur'an: themes and style, London: I B Tauris.
- 1999 "Human Rights in Islam and the United Nations Instruments" in Cotran, E. and Sherif, A. (eds.), Democracy, the Rule of Law, and Islam, London: Kluwer Law International, pp. 435–453.
- 1995 (as translator) Chance or Creation? God's design in the Universe (attributed to Jahiz, translated and introduced), Reading, Berkshire: Garnet.
- 1994 "Qu'ranic Orthography: the written presentation of the recited text of the Qur'an" in Islamic Quarterly, vol. 38 (3), pp. 171–192.
