= Ahmad Belal =

Egyptian footballer (born 1980)

Personal information
- Full name: Ahmed Farag Mohamed Belal
- Date of birth: August 20, 1980 (age 46)
- Place of birth: Diyarb Negm, Sharkia, Egypt
- Height: 1.77 m (5 ft 10 in)
- Position: Striker

Youth career
- MS Tal Al Qadi
- MS Diyarb Negm
- Al Ahly

Senior career*
Years	Team	Apps	(Gls)
1999–2005	Al Ahly	90	(60)
2005–2007	Konyaspor	30	(15)
2006–2006	→ Ankaragücü (loan)	13	(3)
2007–2010	Al Ahly	41	(11)
2010–2011	Smouha	23	(7)
2011–2012	ENPPI	1	(0)
2012–2012	Al-Naft	0	(0)
2013–2013	Al-Wehdat	1	(0)

International career^{‡}
2002–2011	Egypt	26	(19)
- * Club domestic league appearances and goals as of June 1, 2008 ‡ National team caps and goals as of 30 January 2011

Ahmad Farag Mohamed Belal (Arabic: أَحْمَد فَرَج مُحَمَّد بِلَال ; born August 20, 1980) is an Egyptian football striker.

== Career ==
Ahmed Belal started playing professionally for the Egyptian team, Al Ahly, since 2000. He competed for the club for five years. He scored 44 goals in Egyptian League, 3 goals in Egypt Cup, and 9 Goals in African Club Cups.

Ahmed Belal transferred in 2005 to the Turkish side Konyaspor, but chose to return home for his Egyptian side because he wanted to win tournaments, the thing he missed in Turkey.

In 2007, Belal has returned to his home again Al Ahly after a short period in Turkey. In 2009, Belal became the club captain after the release of former captain Shady Mohamed.

In June 2010, Belal moved to Smouha, the club that recently promoted to the Egyptian Premier League. The reason for the transfer is to experience more first team football.

He failed to find form in the first few matches and lost his starting line-up place but after regaining it under new coach Hamza El-Gamal he scored 5 goals and became the team 's top scorer and lead them away from the danger zone.

== International career ==
Belal has an obvious contribution with national teams. He won the African Junior Championship title in 1997, and participated in the FIFA U-17 World Championship 1997 in Egypt, and scored 3 goals there.

His biggest contribution came in African Cup of Nations Tunisia 2004, where he scored a goal for Egypt. Belal did not participate in the African Cup of Nations Egypt 2006 because of the Egyptian Coach Hassan Shehata point of view. While his debut national game was on 8 Aug 2002, against Ethiopia when he scored a goal in a friendly match in Cairo. After 5 years of absence Belal was called up for the Nile Basin Tournament held in Egypt in January 2011, he participated in the first two group matches but failed to score and lost his starting line-up place, however he returned at the semi-finals against Kenya scoring a hat-trick and giving an awe inspiring performance that helped Egypt get a 5–1 victory.

== Honours ==
=== Club ===
Al Ahly

- Egyptian Premier League: 1998–99, 1999–00, 2004–05, 2006–07, 2007–08, 2008–09, 2009–10
- Egyptian Soccer Cup: 2001, 2003, 2007
- Egyptian Super Cup: 2003, 2007, 2008
- CAF Champions League: 2001, 2005, 2008
- African Super Cup: 2002, 2009

=== International ===
Egypt U17

- African Under-17 Championship: 1997

=== Individual ===
- Top scorer in the Egyptian League (2002–2003)
