= Qantir =

Village in Sharqia Governorate, Egypt

Qantir قنتير
- Cidade
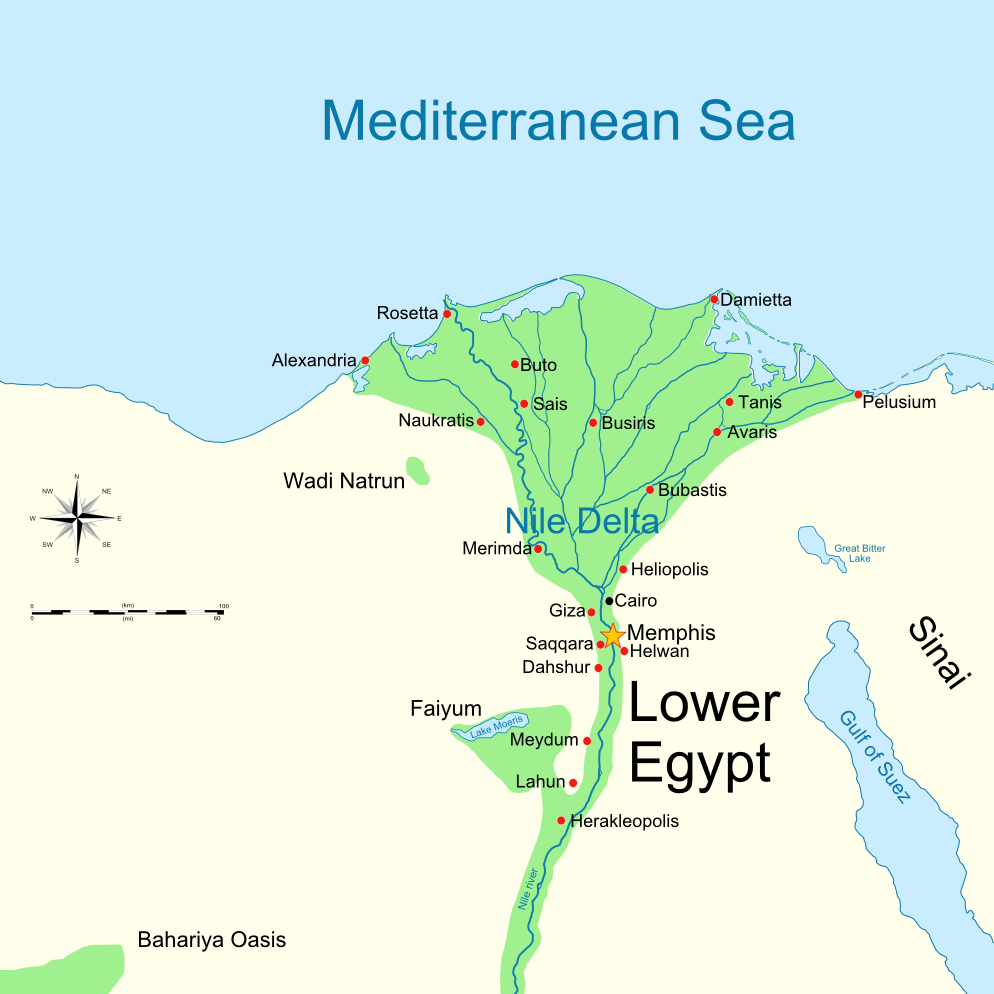
- Map of Lower Egypt showing Avaris, near Qantir/Pi-Ramesses
- Interactive map of Qantir
- Coordinates: 30°48′11″N 31°50′16″E
- Country: Egypt
- Governorate: Sharqia
- Time zone: UTC+2 (EET)
  - Summer (DST): UTC+3 (EEST)

Qantir (Arabic: قنتير, romanized: Qantīr) is a village in Egypt. Qantir is believed to mark what was probably the ancient site of the 19th Dynasty Pharaoh Ramesses II's capital, Pi-Ramesses or Per-Ramesses ("House or Domain of Ramesses"). It is situated around 9 kilometers (5.6 mi) north of Faqous in the Sharqiyah province of the eastern Nile Delta, about 60 mi (97 km) north-east of Cairo.

The Arabic name of the village contains Coptic: ⲉⲛⲧⲏⲣ, lit. 'gods'.

The ancient site of Avaris is located around 2 kilometers (1.2 mi) south of Qantir. This was the older city in this area. Later on, Avaris was absorbed by Pi-Ramesses.

== See also ==
- List of ancient Egyptian sites, including sites of temples
