= Mashtool El Souk =

Mashtool El Souk مشتول السوق
- City
- Location in Egypt
- Coordinates: 30.360556°N 31.3775°E
- Country: Egypt
- Governorate: Sharqia

Area
  - Total: 75.70 km^{2} (29.23 sq mi)

Population (2023)
  - Total: 243,561
  - Density: 3,217/km^{2} (8,333/sq mi)
- Time zone: UTC+2 (EET)
  - Summer (DST): UTC+3 (EEST)

Mashtool El Souk (Arabic: مشتول السوق) is a city and a markaz in the Sharqia Governorate, Egypt. It had a population of 81,131 in the city and 243,561 in the whole markaz the according to 2023 estimates. The central town is an old market center (souk).

== Geography ==
The city is located in the Nile Delta within the Sharqia Governorate. It lies west of 10th of Ramadan city and northwest of Obour and is surrounded by agricultural land.

== Climate ==
Köppen-Geiger climate classification system classifies its climate as hot desert (BWh).

== See also ==
- List of cities and towns in Egypt
