= Sama El Masry =

Egyptian actress, singer and dancer

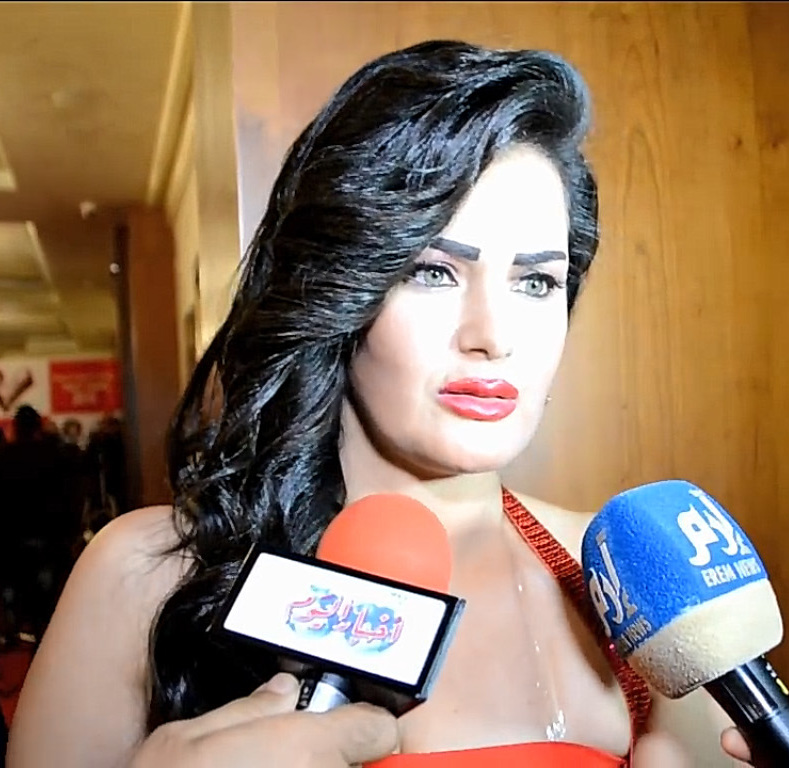
- Born: Samia Ahmed Attia Abdel Rahman; 15 July 1976 (age 49); Hihya, Sharqia, Egypt
- Occupations: Actress, singer
- Children: 1

Samia Ahmed Attia Abdel Rahman Hadaka, (Arabic: سامية أحمد عطية عبد الرحمن حداقه) known as Sama Elmasry, is an Egyptian actress, singer and belly dancer.

== Career ==
She began to work at Mehwar TV Channel following her graduation from the Faculty of Arts and has also appeared in three cinema films since 2008.

== Controversies ==
The 2011 film Ala Wahda We Nos' (على واحدة ونص), written by Sama and also featuring Sama in the lead role and in criticism of the sexual exploitation of female media workers, was condemned by various segments of the Egyptian society. Al-Azhar called on spectators to boycott the film for its allegedly obscene content and the journalists' union claimed that the film was degrading the profession. Action was taken by Sayed Khatab, the head of the Censorship Board of Artistic Works on the call of the journalists' union and a "revised" edition could be released by 14 March 2012.

By 2013, Sama started to produce satirical YouTube videos in criticism of the FJP government, Muslim Brotherhood, and other Islamist factions and with her fourth video, featuring her wearing a headscarf and also a niqab, she received death threats, because she was, "as a hooker, making fun of hijab".

Sama gained international notoriety when her video criticising Barack Obama's policy towards Egypt and declaring support for the stance of Abdel Fattah el-Sisi went viral on the Internet in early August 2013.

In April 2014, she was detained "pending an investigation into an unlicensed television channel allegedly owned by her." This was because she had made a video mocking Mortada Mansour, the head of the Zamalek sports club, whether because she disliked him, or because he briefly planned to run for president against al-Sisi. She sings "Ya Mortada, Ya Mortada" to the tune of the Arabo-Turkish song, "Ya Mustafa" with some suggestive lyrics, first in a long gown and then in a Zamalek football team t-shirt and playing with a soccer ball. She also mocked comedian Bassem Youssef. She was fined, but returned to the celebrity circuit and more outrageous videos.

On 23 April 2020, she was sued for libel and defamation by an Egyptian TV presenter Reham Saeed. On the next day, she was arrested. On 27 June 2020, she was sentenced to serve three years in jail, and obligation to pay 300 thousand Egyptian pounds.
