= Aly Saad =

- Born: 25 April 1954 (age 72); Sharkia, Egypt
- Scientific career
- Fields: Medicine (cardiology)
- Workplaces: Zagazig University

Professor Aly Saad (Arabic: علي محمد عبدالرحمن علي سعد born 25 April 1954), is a professor of cardiology at Zagazig University and a member of the higher committee of promotion of professors and assistant professors of cardiovascular diseases and critical care subspecialty in Egypt (Supreme council of Egyptian universities).

== Background ==
While an undergraduate, he established the Zagazig Student Scientific Society and co-founded the Egyptian Association of Medical Scientific Societies (EAMSS), serving as its first president. The association's activities include an annual international medical student exchange program, the organization of medical conferences, and the publication of scientific journals.

During this period he prepared and broadcast a public scientific program, Science in your hands, on Abu Dhabi radio for over two years. Immediately postgraduate, he with others founded the Society of Young Doctors. After his residency in cardiovascular disease he became an assistant lecturer in cardiovascular diseases and during this period he was a director of catheterization unit.

Through a long scientific and academic life he became a professor of cardiovascular disease in Zagazig University. He supervised a long list of leading master and doctorate theses and published many scientific papers in a wide variety of cardiovascular subspecialties. He is a founding member of the Working Group of Drug Therapy (Egyptian Society of Cardiology) and the Egyptian Society of Atherosclerosis that organized a considerable number of national and international conferences, and through them and in others he gave many scientific talks.

== Recognition ==
- Fellow of the European Society of Cardiology in 2000 he has received many acknowledgements in (2000, 2008, 2013)
- Acknowledged as an outstanding reviewer by Elsevier Publisher (2014, 2015)
- Best investigator in EuroHeart Survey program of European Society of Cardiology.
- Acknowledged from Zagazig Faculty of medicine and many Other Arabic, Egyptian and international bodies.
- Selected as one of the most eminent cardiologists in the Arabic world by cardiology department, Zagazig University, supreme council of Egyptian universities upon the request of theArab League.
- Selected as one of international expert in preventive Cardiology and member of panel for reviewing guidelines and putting recommendations in this fields by nine European societies helping in health plans in the European Union.

== Memberships ==
- Member of editorial board of The Egyptian Heart Journal (the official journal of the Egyptian Society of Cardiology, a member of The European Society of Cardiology).
- Selected as a member in the European Endothelium Committee (Mediterranean Project).
- Member of organizing committee, speaker and chairman of the 4th World Congress of Echo-cardiography and Vascular Ultrasound organized by the International Society of Cardiovascular Ultrasound (ISCU) (Cairo, 19–21 January 2000)
- Member of the organizing committee, speaker and/or chairman of the annual scientific joint conference of department of cardiology at Zagazig University and the Egyptian Society of Cardiology from 1993 to 2014.
- Member of the panellists of the joint meeting of the Egyptian Society of Cardiology and Texas Heart Institute (Cairo, 1 March 1995)
- Member of scientific board and chairman in the 6th annual congress of the Egyptian working group of international cardiology
- Member of the organizing committee of the annual congress of the Mediterranean Association of Cardiology and Cardiac Surgery (MACCS) in Egypt at Sharm El-sheikh (7–10 November 2001).
- Member of the executive board of the scientific council of Zagazig faculty of medicine.
- He is a voting (and honourable EB) member of working group of Hypertension and Heart (European Society of Cardiology), European Association of heart failure, European Association of PCI, European Association of prevention and rehabilitation.

== International research programs ==
- Euro Heart Survey (EHS) – European Society of Cardiology (ESC)
  - EHS acute coronary syndrome (ACS) snapshot, ESC (2010).
  - Euro Hear Survey (EHS) on Percutaneous Coronary Intervention (PCI) Registry (2008–2010)
  - Euro Hear Survey (EHS) on Acute Coronary Syndrome III (ACS III) registry, ESC (2008).
  - ACS study, ESC (2006).
  - Euro Hear Survey (EHS) on Heart Failure II (EHFII) Registry.
  - PCI study (2005–2006).
  - Euro Hear Survey (EHS) on Atrial Fibrillation (AF) Registry (2004) (from which HAS bleed and CHAD2score Score have been established)
  - Ischaemic Heart Diseases and Dibetes study (2003)
  - Euro Heart Survey on Coronary Revascularization (REVASC) registry study (2002)
- EurObservational Research Program (EORP)
  - EurObservational Research Program (EORP) on Pregnancy and Cardiac Disease (ROPAC) registry
  - PeriPartum Cardiomyopathy (PPCM) registry
  - Cardiomyopathy Long Term registry
- Others
  - GAPS-HF Study World Heart Failure Society.
  - Expert opinion for EAPCI pre and post results for DAPT, ITALIC, ESAR-SAFE and MATRIX studies.

== Some of the publications and researches ==
- Acute Coronary Syndrome (ACS) snapshot Registry
  - Puymirat, Etienne; Battler, Alex; Birkhead, John; Bueno, Hector; Clemmensen, Peter; Cottin, Yves; Fox, Keith AA; Gorenek, Bulent; Hamm, Christian; Huber, Kurt; Lettino, Maddalena; Lindahl, Bertil; Müller, Christian; Parkhomenko, Alexander; Price, Susanna; Quinn, Tom; Schiele, Francois; Simoons, Maarten; Tatu-Chitoiu, Gabriel; Tubaro, Marco; Vrints, Christiaan; Zahger, Doron; Zeymer, Uwe; Danchin, Nicolas (2013). "Euro Heart Survey 2009 Snapshot: Regional variations in presentation and management of patients with AMI in 47 countries". European Heart Journal - Acute Cardiovascular Care. 2 (4): 359–370. doi:10.1177/2048872613497341. PMC 3821830. PMID 24338295.
- Euro Heart Survey on Coronary Revascularization (REVASC) Registry
  - Lenzen, M. J; Scholte Op Reimer, W. J M; Pedersen, S. S; Boersma, E; Maier, W; Widimsky, P; Simoons, M. L; Mercado, N. F; Wijns, W (2007). "The additional value of patient-reported health status in predicting 1-year mortality after invasive coronary procedures: A report from the Euro Heart Survey on Coronary Revascularisation". Heart. 93 (3): 339–344. doi:10.1136/hrt.2005.086868. PMC 1861429. PMID 16980515.
  - Breeman, Arno; Hordijk-Trion, Marjo; Lenzen, Mattie; Hoeks, Sanne; Ottervanger, Jan Paul; Bertrand, Michel E; Sechtem, Udo; Zaliunas, Remigijus; Legrand, Victor; De Boer, Menko-Jan; Stahle, Elisabeth; Mercado, Nestor; Wijns, William; Boersma, Eric; Euro Heart Survey on Coronary Revascularization (2006). "Treatment decisions in stable coronary artery disease: Insights from the Euro Heart Survey on Coronary Revascularization". The Journal of Thoracic and Cardiovascular Surgery. 132 (5): 1001–1009. doi:10.1016/j.jtcvs.2006.05.051. PMID 17059915.
  - Breeman, A; Bertrand, M. E; Ottervanger, J. P; Hoeks, S; Lenzen, M; Sechtem, U; Legrand, V; De Boer, M.-J; Wijns, W; Boersma, E (2006). "Diabetes Does Not Influence Treatment Decisions Regarding Revascularization in Patients with Stable Coronary Artery Disease". Diabetes Care. 29 (9): 2003–2011. doi:10.2337/dc06-0118. PMID 16936144.
  - Lenzen, Mattie; Scholte Op Reimer, Wilma; Norekvål, Tone M; De Geest, Sabina; Fridlund, Bengt; Heikkilä, Johanna; Jaarsma, Tiny; Mårtensson, Jan; Moons, Philip; Smith, Karen; Stewart, Simon; Strömberg, Anna; Thompson, David R; Wijns, William (2016). "Pharmacological Treatment and Perceived Health Status During 1-Year Follow up in Patients Diagnosed with Coronary Artery Disease, but Ineligible for Revascularization: Results from the Euro Heart Survey on Coronary Revascularization". European Journal of Cardiovascular Nursing. 5 (2): 115–121. doi:10.1016/j.ejcnurse.2006.01.003. PMID 16530486. S2CID 32489896.
  - Lenzen, Mattie; Reimer, Wilma Scholte Op; Norekvål, Tone M; Geest, Sabina De; Fridlund, Bengt; Haikkilä, Johanna; Jaarsma, Tiny; Mårtensson, Jan; Moons, Philip; Smith, Karen; Stewart, Simon; Strömberg, Anna; Thompson, David R; Wijns, William (2017). "1304: Treatment and health status in patients with proven coronary artery disease, but ineligible for revascularization. A report from the Euro Heart Survey on revascularization". European Journal of Cardiovascular Nursing. 5: 4–5. doi:10.1177/14745151060050S104. S2CID 72641306.
  - Hordijk-Trion, Marjo; Lenzen, Mattie; Wijns, William; De Jaegere, Peter; Simoons, Maarten L; Scholte Op Reimer, Wilma J.M; Bertrand, Michel E; Mercado, Nestor; Boersma, Eric; EHS-CR Investigators (2006). "Patients enrolled in coronary intervention trials are not representative of patients in clinical practice: Results from the Euro Heart Survey on Coronary Revascularization". European Heart Journal. 27 (6): 671–678. doi:10.1093/eurheartj/ehi731. PMID 16423872.
  - Lenzen, M.J; Boersma, E; Bertrand, M.E; Maier, W; Moris, C; Piscione, F; Sechtem, U; Stahle, E; Widimsky, P; De Jaegere, P; Scholte Op Reimer, W.J.M; Mercado, N; Wijns, W (2005). "Management and outcome of patients with established coronary artery disease: The Euro Heart Survey on coronary revascularization" (PDF). European Heart Journal. 26 (12): 1169–1179. doi:10.1093/eurheartj/ehi238. PMID 15802360.
- Euro Hear Survey (EHS) on Diabetes and Heart Registry
  - Anselmino, M; Ohrvik, J; Ryden, L (2010). "Resting heart rate in patients with stable coronary artery disease and diabetes: A report from the Euro Heart Survey on Diabetes and the Heart". European Heart Journal. 31 (24): 3040–3045. doi:10.1093/eurheartj/ehq368. hdl:2318/104135. PMID 20935002.
  - Anselmino, Matteo; Malmberg, Klas; Öhrvik, John; Rydén, Lars (2008). "Evidence-based medication and revascularization: Powerful tools in the management of patients with diabetes and coronary artery disease: A report from the Euro Heart Survey on diabetes and the heart". European Journal of Cardiovascular Prevention & Rehabilitation. 15 (2): 216–223. doi:10.1097/HJR.0b013e3282f335d0. PMID 18391651. S2CID 12066481.
  - Anselmino, M; Ohrvik, J; Malmberg, K; Standl, E; Ryden, L (2007). "Glucose lowering treatment in patients with coronary artery disease is prognostically important not only in established but also in newly detected diabetes mellitus: A report from the Euro Heart Survey on Diabetes and the Heart". European Heart Journal. 29 (2): 177–184. doi:10.1093/eurheartj/ehm519. PMID 18156611.
  - Anselmino, Matteo; Bartnik, Malgorzata; Malmberg, Klas; Rydén, Lars (2016). "Management of coronary artery disease in patients with and without diabetes mellitus. Acute management reasonable but secondary prevention unacceptably poor: A report from the Euro Heart Survey on Diabetes and the heart". European Journal of Cardiovascular Prevention & Rehabilitation. 14 (1): 28–36. doi:10.1097/01.hjr.0000199496.23838.83. PMID 17301624. S2CID 45472074.
  - Dotevall, A; Rosengren, A; Bartnik, M; Malmberg, K; Ohrvik, J; Simoons, M; Ryden, L; European Heart Survey Investigators (2007). "Sex-related aspects on abnormal glucose regulation in patients with coronary artery disease". European Heart Journal. 28 (3): 310–315. doi:10.1093/eurheartj/ehl458. PMID 17242006.
  - Bartnik, M; Ryden, L; Malmberg, K; Ohrvik, J; Pyorala, K; Standl, E; Ferrari, R; Simoons, M; Soler-Soler, J (2007). "Oral glucose tolerance test is needed for appropriate classification of glucose regulation in patients with coronary artery disease: A report from the Euro Heart Survey on Diabetes and the Heart". Heart. 93 (1): 72–77. doi:10.1136/hrt.2005.086975. PMC 1861359. PMID 16905628.
  - Lenzen, M; Ryden, L; Ohrvik, J; Bartnik, M; Malmberg, K; Scholte Op Reimer, W; Simoons, M. L (2006). "Diabetes known or newly detected, but not impaired glucose regulation, has a negative influence on 1-year outcome in patients with coronary artery disease: A report from the Euro Heart Survey on diabetes and the heart". European Heart Journal. 27 (24): 2969–2974. doi:10.1093/eurheartj/ehl363. PMID 17090612.
  - Bartnik, M; Rydén, L; Ferrari, R; Malmberg, K; Pyörälä, K; Simoons, M; Standl, E; Soler-Soler, J; Ohrvik, J (2004). "The prevalence of abnormal glucose regulation in patients with coronary artery disease across Europe The Euro Heart Survey on diabetes and the heart". European Heart Journal. 25 (21): 1880–1890. doi:10.1016/j.ehj.2004.07.027. PMID 15522466.
  - 23- Abnormal glucose regulation in patients with coronary artery disease across Europe M Bartnik, L Rydén, R Ferrari, K Malmberg, K Pyorala, ML Simoons, E Standl, J Soler-Soler, J Ohrvik.. Aly Saad...." Diabetologia 47, A61-A61.2004 (23)
- Euro Hear Survey (EHS) on Heart Failure II (EHFII) Registry
  - Harjola, Veli-Pekka (2010). "Characteristics, outcomes, and predictors of mortality at 3 months and 1 year in patients hospitalized for acute heart failure". European Journal of Heart Failure. 12 (3): 239–248. doi:10.1093/eurjhf/hfq002. PMID 20156940.
  - Contemporary management of octogenarians hospitalized for heart failure in Europe: Euro Heart Failure Survey II Michel Komajda, Olivier Hanon, Matthias Hochadel, Jose Luis Lopez-Sendon, Ferenc Follath, Piotr Ponikowski, Veli-Pekka Harjola, Helmut Drexler, Kenneth Dickstein, Luigi Tavazzi, Markku Nieminen,.... Aly Saad..... European heart journal, 2009
  - Gender related differences in patients presenting with acute heart failure. Results from EuroHeart Failure Survey II Markku S Nieminen, Veli‐Pekka Harjola, Matthias Hochadel, Helmut Drexler, Michel Komajda, Dirk Brutsaert, Kenneth Dickstein, Piotr Ponikowski, Luigi Tavazzi, Ferenc Follath, Jose Luis Lopez‐Sendon...Aly Saad..... European journal of heart failure, 2008
  - Nieminen, M. S; Brutsaert, D; Dickstein, K; Drexler, H; Follath, F; Harjola, V.-P; Hochadel, M; Komajda, M; Lassus, J; Lopez-Sendon, J. L; Ponikowski, P; Tavazzi, L; Heart Failure Association, European Society of Cardiology (2006). "Euro Heart Failure Survey II (EHFS II): A survey on hospitalized acute heart failure patients: Description of population". European Heart Journal. 27 (22): 2725–2736. doi:10.1093/eurheartj/ehl193. PMID 17000631.
- Euro Hear Survey (EHS) on Acute Coronary Syndrome III (ACS III) Registry
  - Gitt, Anselm K; Hochadel, Matthias; Zahn, Ralf; Zeymer, Uwe; Schiele, Francois; Group, EHS ACS-Registry Study; Ludwigshafen, Herzzentrum (2015). "Higher In-Hospital-Mortality of Nstemi as Compared to Unstable Angina Despite Higher Rate of Invasive Therapy in Clinical Practice: Results of the Ehs Acs Registry". Journal of the American College of Cardiology. 65 (10): A189. doi:10.1016/S0735-1097(15)60189-9.
  - Schiele, Francois; Bueno, Hector; Hochadel, Matthias; Tubaro, Marco; Meneveau, Nicolas; Wojakowski, Wojciech; Gierlotka, Marek; Bassand, Jean-Pierre; Fox, Keith; Gitt, Anselm (2014). "Admission Hyperglycemia Improves the Grace Risk Score for Prediction of In-Hospital Mortality: Insights from the Euro Heart Survey Acs Iii". Journal of the American College of Cardiology. 63 (12): A47. doi:10.1016/S0735-1097(14)60047-4.
  - Gitt, A. K; Hochadel, M; Zahn, R; Zeymer, U; Wojakowski, W; Tendera, M; Schiele, F; Bassand, J. P (2013). "Atrial fibrillation is an independent predictor of hospital mortality in STEMI but not in NSTE-ACS in clinical practice - results of the Euro heart survey ACS-registry". European Heart Journal. 34 (1): 22–9. doi:10.1093/eurheartj/eht307.22. PMID 23028171.
  - Gitt, Anselm K; Hochadel, Matthias; Schiele, Francois; Wojakowski, Wojtek; Tendera, Michal; Zahn, Ralf; Zeymer, Uwe (2013). "Renal Failure but Not Diabetes Determines Hospital Mortaliy in Patients with Nste-Acs: Results of the Euro Heart Survey Acs Registry". Journal of the American College of Cardiology. 61 (10): E174. doi:10.1016/S0735-1097(13)60175-8.
  - Gitt, A. K; Hochadel, M; Wojakowski, W; Zeymer, U; Tendera, M; Schiele, F; Zahn, R; Bassand, J. P (2013). "Renal failure but not diabetes determines hospital mortality in patients with NSTE-ACS - results of the Euro heart survey ACS-registry". European Heart Journal. 34: 413. doi:10.1093/eurheartj/eht307.P413.
  - Wojakowski, Wojciech; Tendera, Michal; Tubaro, Marco; Bueno, Hector; Hochadel, Matthias; Hasin, Yonathan; Bassand, Jean – Pierre; Gitt, Anselm K (2011). "AS-048 In-Hospital Outcome of Patients with Acute Coronary Syndromes and Anemia at Presentation. Euro Heart Survey ACS III Registry (2006-2008)". The American Journal of Cardiology. 107 (8): 18A–19A. doi:10.1016/j.amjcard.2011.02.039.
  - Wojakowski, Wojciech; Tendera, Michal; Tubaro, Marco; Gierlotka, Marek; Bueno, Hector; Hochadel, Matthias; Hasin, Yonathan; Bassand, Jean – Pierre; Gitt, Anselm K (2011). "AS-098 Primary PCI with DES Implantation in Patients with STEMI/LBBB. Euro Heart Survey ACS III Registry (2006-2008)". The American Journal of Cardiology. 107 (8): 71A–72A. doi:10.1016/j.amjcard.2011.02.169.
  - Papp, Andrea; Wojakowski, Wojtek; Gierlotka, Marek; Bueno, Hector; Zahn, Ralf; Zeymer, Uwe; Schiele, Francois; Hochadel, Matthias; Bassand, Jean-Pierre; Gitt, Anselm (2011). "Determinants of Stroke and its Impact on Outcome of Acs in Clinical Practice in Europe: Lessons from the Euro Heart Survey Acs Registry". Journal of the American College of Cardiology. 57 (14): E1104. doi:10.1016/S0735-1097(11)61104-2.
  - Value of Killip classification first described in 1967 for risk stratification of STEMI and NSTE-ACS in the new millennium: Lessons from the Euro Heart Survey ACS Registry AK Gitt, U Zeymer, M Hochadel, M Gierlotka, H Bueno, R Zahn, W Wojakowski, F Schiele, M Tendera, JP Bassand...Aly Saad.. .......... EUROPEAN HEART JOURNAL, 2010
  - Reperfusion strategy in Europe: temporal trends in performance measures for reperfusion therapy in ST-elevation myocardial infarction François Schiele, Matthias Hochadel, Marco Tubaro, Nicolas Meneveau, Wojtek Wojakowski, Marek Gierlotka, Lech Polonski, Jean-Pierre Bassand, Keith AA Fox, Anselm K Gitt....Aly Saad... ..... EUROPEAN HEART JOURNAL, 2010
  - MAJOR BLEEDING COMPLICATIONS IN PATIENTS WITH STEMI ACCOUNT FOR A DOUBLING IN HOSPITAL MORTALITY IN CLINICAL PRACTICE: LESSONS FROM THE EURO HEART SURVEY ACS REGISTRY.Anselm K. Gitt; Frank Towae; Ralf Zahn; Huo Katus; Marek Gierlotka; Wojtek Wojakowski; Michal Tendera; Francois Schiele; Jean-Pierre Bassand.....Aly Saad.......... EUROPEAN HEART JOURNAL, 2009
- Euro Hear Survey (EHS) on Atrial Fibrillation (AF) Registry
  - Marcucci, Maura; Lip, Gregory Y.H; Nieuwlaat, Robby; Pisters, Ron; Crijns, Harry J.G.M; Iorio, Alfonso (2014). "Stroke and Bleeding Risk Co-distribution in Real-world Patients with Atrial Fibrillation: The Euro Heart Survey". The American Journal of Medicine. 127 (10): 979–986.e2. doi:10.1016/j.amjmed.2014.05.003. hdl:2434/240867. PMID 24838192.
  - Fumagalli, S; Nieuwlaat, R; Tarantini, F; De Vos, C. B; Werter, C. J; Le Heuzey, J. Y; Marchionni, N; Crijns, H. J (2012). "Characteristics, management and prognosis of elderly patients in the Euro Heart Survey on atrial fibrillation". Aging Clinical and Experimental Research. 24 (5): 517–23. doi:10.3275/8408. PMID 22572627. S2CID 39395201.
  - Clinical correlates of immediate success and outcome at 1-year follow-up of real-world cardioversion of atrial fibrillation: the Euro Heart Survey Ron Pisters, Robby Nieuwlaat, Martin H Prins, Jean-Yves Le Heuzey, Aldo P Maggioni, A John Camm, Harry JGM Crijns, Aly Saad...Europace, 2012
  - A novel user-friendly score (HAS-BLED) to assess 1-year risk of major bleeding in patients with atrial fibrillation: the Euro Heart Survey Ron Pisters, Deirdre A Lane, Robby Nieuwlaat, Cees B de Vos, Harry JGM Crijns, Gregory YH Lip......., Aly Saad.... Chest,2010
  - Progression from paroxysmal to persistent atrial fibrillation: clinical correlates and prognosis Cees B de Vos, Ron Pisters, Robby Nieuwlaat, Martin H Prins, Robert G Tieleman, Robert-Jan S Coelen, Antonius C van den Heijkant, Maurits A Allessie, Harry JGM Crijns........Aly Saad....Journal of the American College of Cardiology, 2010
  - Refining clinical risk stratification for predicting stroke and thromboembolism in atrial fibrillation using a novel risk factor-based approach: the euro heart survey on atrial fibrillation Gregory YH Lip, Robby Nieuwlaat, Ron Pisters, Deirdre A Lane, Harry JGM Crijns........Aly Saad....Chest, 2010
  - Atrial fibrillation and heart failure in cardiology practice: reciprocal impact and combined management from the perspective of atrial fibrillation: results of the Euro Heart Survey on atrial fibrillation Robby Nieuwlaat, Luc W Eurlings, John G Cleland, Stuart M Cobbe, Panos E Vardas, Alessandro Capucci, José L López-Sendòn, Joan G Meeder, Yigal M Pinto, Harry HJGM Crijns........Aly Saad.... Journal of the American College of Cardiology, 2009
- Euro Hear Survey (EHS) on Percutaneous Coronary Intervention (PCI) Registry
  - Adamo, Marianna; Byrne, Robert; Baumbach, Andreas; Haude, Michael; Windecker, Stephan; Valgimigli, Marco (2016). "Assessing the cardiology community position on transradial intervention and the use of bivalirudin in patients with acute coronary syndrome undergoing invasive management: Results of an EAPCI survey". EuroIntervention. 12 (9): 1154–1163. doi:10.4244/EIJY15M12_01. PMID 26674737.
  - Fate of Patients With Coronary Perforation Complicating Percutaneous Coronary Intervention (from the Euro Heart Survey Percutaneous Coronary Intervention Registry).Bauer T, Boeder N, Nef HM, Möllmann H, Hochadel M, Marco J, Weidinger F, Zeymer U, Get AK, Hamm CW....Aly Saad...Am J Cardiol. 2015 Nov 1;116(9):1363-7
  - Weipert, Kay F; Bauer, Timm; Nef, Holger M; Möllmann, Helge; Hochadel, Matthias; Marco, Jean; Weidinger, Franz; Zeymer, Uwe; Gitt, Anselm K; Hamm, Christian W (2015). "Use and outcome of thrombus aspiration in patients with primary PCI for acute ST-elevation myocardial infarction: Results from the multinational Euro Heart Survey PCI Registry". Heart and Vessels. 31 (9): 1438–1445. doi:10.1007/s00380-015-0754-1. PMID 26438532. S2CID 28271143.
  - Valgimigli, Marco; Costa, Francesco; Byrne, Robert; Haude, Michael; Baumbach, Andreas; Windecker, Stephan (2015). "Dual antiplatelet therapy duration after coronary stenting in clinical practice: Results of an EAPCI survey". EuroIntervention. 11 (1): 68–74. doi:10.4244/EIJV11I1A11. PMID 25982650.
  - Fate of patients with coronary perforation complicating PCI: insights from the Euro Heart Survey PCI registry T Bauer, H Nef, M Hochadel, H Moellmann, F Weidinger, J Marco, A Gitt, U Zeymer, C Hamm...Aly Saad.... EUROPEAN HEART JOURNAL, 2014
  - Use and outcome of thrombectomy in patients with primary PCI for acute ST elevation myocardial infarction: results from the Euro Heart Survey PCI registry T Bauer, K Weipert, M Hochadel, H Nef, H Moellmann, J Marco, F Weidinger, A Gitt, U Zeymer, C Hamm....Aly Saad... EUROPEAN HEART JOURNAL, 2014
  - Achievement of TIMI-3- Flow Results in Significant Decrease in Hospital Mortality of Primary PCI for STEMI and PCI for NSTE-ACS – Findings of the Euro Heart Survey PCI- Registry
  - Bauer, Timm; Gitt, Anselm K; Hochadel, Matthias; Möllmann, Helge; Nef, Holger; Weidinger, Franz; Zahn, Ralf; Hamm, Christian W; Marco, Jean; Zeymer, Uwe (2013). "Left circumflex artery-related myocardial infarction: Does ST elevation matter? Results from the Euro Heart Survey PCI registry". International Journal of Cardiology. 168 (6): 5239–5242. doi:10.1016/j.ijcard.2013.08.024. PMID 23998547.
  - Prima- vista multi-vessel percutaneous coronary intervention in haemodynamically stable patients with acute coronary syndromes: Analysis of over 4.400 patients in the EHS-PCI registry Timm Bauer, Uwe Zeymer, Matthias Hochadel, Helge Möllmann, Franz Weidinger, Ralf Zahn, Holger M Nef, Christian W Hamm, Jean Marco, Anselm K Gitt, Aly Saad...International Journal of Cardiology, 2013
  - Bauer, Timm; Möllmann, Helge; Zeymer, Uwe; Hochadel, Matthias; Nef, Holger; Weidinger, Franz; Zahn, Ralf; Hamm, Christian W; Marco, Jean; Gitt, Anselm K (2011). "Multivessel percutaneous coronary intervention in patients with stable angina: A common approach? Lessons learned from the EHS PCI registry". Heart and Vessels. 27 (5): 453–459. doi:10.1007/s00380-011-0207-4. PMID 22068609. S2CID 11637450.
  - Clinical and angiographic comparison between circumflex artery-related ST elevation and non ST elevation myocardial infarctions: results from the Euro Heart Survey PCI registry T Bauer, A Gitt, M Hochadel, H Moellmann, H Nef, F Weidinger, J Marco, R Zahn, C Hamm, U Zeymer, Aly Saad. EUROPEAN HEART JOURNAL 33, 461–462 2012
  - Bauer, Timm; Zeymer, Uwe; Hochadel, Matthias; Möllmann, Helge; Weidinger, Franz; Zahn, Ralf; Nef, Holger M; Hamm, Christian W; Marco, Jean; Gitt, Anselm K (2012). "Use and Outcomes of Multivessel Percutaneous Coronary Intervention in Patients with Acute Myocardial Infarction Complicated by Cardiogenic Shock (from the EHS-PCI Registry)". The American Journal of Cardiology. 109 (7): 941–946. doi:10.1016/j.amjcard.2011.11.020. PMID 22236463.
  - Bauer, Timm; Möllmann, Helge; Weidinger, Franz; Zeymer, Uwe; Seabra-Gomes, Ricardo; Eberli, Franz; Serruys, Patrick; Vahanian, Alec; Silber, Sigmund; Wijns, William; Hochadel, Matthias; Nef, Holger M; Hamm, Christian W; Marco, Jean; Gitt, Anselm K (2011). "Impact of diabetes mellitus status on coronary pathoanatomy and interventional treatment: Insights from the Euro heart survey PCI registry". Catheterization and Cardiovascular Interventions. 78 (5): 702–709. doi:10.1002/ccd.22939. PMID 21234924. S2CID 34834177.
  - Bauer, Timm; Möllmann, Helge; Weidinger, Franz; Zeymer, Uwe; Seabra-Gomes, Ricardo; Eberli, Franz; Serruys, Patrick; Vahanian, Alec; Silber, Sigmund; Wijns, William; Hochadel, Matthias; Nef, Holger M; Hamm, Christian W; Marco, Jean; Gitt, Anselm K (2011). "Predictors of hospital mortality in the elderly undergoing percutaneous coronary intervention for acute coronary syndromes and stable angina". International Journal of Cardiology. 151 (2): 164–169. doi:10.1016/j.ijcard.2010.05.006. PMID 20605241.
  - The high event rate in patients with diabetes mellitus treated with PCI for acute coronary syndromes is observed in the subgroup of patients with impaired renal function. Results of the Euro Heart Survey U Zeymer, T Bauer, M Hochadel, F Weidinger, R Zahn, AK Gitt,... Aly Saad... EUROPEAN HEART JOURNAL, 2011
  - Use and outcomes of multi-vessel percutaneous coronary intervention in haemodynamically stable patients with acute coronary syndrome: results of the EHS-PCI registry T Bauer, U Zeymer, M Hochadel, H Moellmann, F Weidinger, R Zahn, HM Nef, C Hamm, J Marco, AK Gitt, Aly Saad.. EUROPEAN HEART JOURNAL 32, 1042–1042. 2011
  - Zeymer, U; Bauer, T; Hamm, C; Zahn, R; Weidinger, F; Seabra-Gomes, R; Hochadel, M; Marco, J; Gitt, A (2011). "Use and impact of intra-aortic balloon pump on mortality in patients with acute myocardial infarction complicated by cardiogenic shock: Results of the Euro Heart Survey on PCI". EuroIntervention. 7 (4): 437–41. doi:10.4244/EIJV7I4A72. PMID 21764661.
  - EuroHeart score for the evaluation of in-hospital mortality in patients undergoing percutaneous coronary intervention Maarten de Mulder, Anselm Gitt, Ron van Domburg, Matthias Hochadel, Ricardo Seabra-Gomes, Patrick W Serruys, Sigmund Silber, Franz Weidinger, William Wijns, Uwe Zeymer, Christian Hamm, Eric Boersma, Aly Saad.... European heart journal 32 (11), 1398–1408.2011
  - CURRENT PRACTICE OF PCI FOR ACS AND STABLE ANGINA IN EUROPE 2005–2008: LESSONS FROM THE EURO HEART SURVEY PCI REGISTRY Anselm K Gitt, Matthias Hochadel, Uwe Zeymer, Ralf Zahn, Franz Weidinger, Timm Bauer, Christian Hamm, Aly Saad. Journal of the American College of Cardiology,2011
  - Lower Rate of Major Bleeding Complications With Radial Arterial Access for Elective PCI in Clinical Practice in Europe: Results of the Euro Heart Survey PCI-Registry Anselm K Gitt, Timm Bauer, Uwe Zeymer, Matthias Hochadel, Ralf Zahn, Christian Hamm, Aly Saad ... Circulation 122 (21 Supplement), A20964.2010
  - Bauer, Timm; Möllmann, Helge; Weidinger, Franz; Zeymer, Uwe; Seabra-Gomes, Ricardo; Eberli, Franz; Serruys, Patrick; Vahanian, Alec; Silber, Sigmund; Wijns, William; Hochadel, Matthias; Nef, Holger M; Hamm, Christian W; Marco, Jean; Gitt, Anselm K (2010). "Use of platelet glycoprotein IIb/IIIa inhibitors in diabetics undergoing PCI for non-ST-segment elevation acute coronary syndromes: Impact of clinical status and procedural characteristics". Clinical Research in Cardiology. 99 (6): 375–383. doi:10.1007/s00392-010-0130-1. PMC 2876272. PMID 20186546.
  - IMPACT OF RENAL FAILURE ON MORTALITY, STROKE AND BLEEDING COMPLICATIONS IN THE SETTING OF PCI FOR ACS OR STABLE ANGINA IN EUROPE: LESSONS FROM THE EURO HEART SURVEY PCI REGISTRY Anselm K Gitt, Timm Bauer, Uwe Zeymer, Ralf Zahn, Franz Weidinger, Matthias Hochadel, Christian Hamm, ...Aly Saad... Journal of the American College of Cardiology, 2010
  - Incidence and clinical impact of stroke complicating percutaneous coronary intervention results of the euro heart survey percutaneous coronary interventions registry Nicolas Werner, Timm Bauer, Matthias Hochadel, Ralf Zahn, Franz Weidinger, Jean Marco, Christian Hamm, Anselm K Gitt, Uwe Zeymer,.. Aly Saad .. Circulation: Cardiovascular Interventions, 2013
- EurObservational Research Program (EORP) on Pregnancy and Cardiac Disease (ROPAC) Registry
  - Van Hagen, Iris M; Boersma, Eric; Johnson, Mark R; Thorne, Sara A; Parsonage, William A; Escribano Subías, Pilar; Leśniak-Sobelga, Agata; Irtyuga, Olga; Sorour, Khaled A; Taha, Nasser; Maggioni, Aldo P; Hall, Roger; Roos-Hesselink, Jolien W; ROPAC investigators EORP team (2016). "Global cardiac risk assessment in the Registry of Pregnancy and Cardiac disease: Results of a registry from the European Society of Cardiology". European Journal of Heart Failure. 18 (5): 523–533. doi:10.1002/ejhf.501. PMID 27006109.
  - Salam, Amar M; Ertekin, Ebru; Van Hagen, Iris M; Al Suwaidi, Jassim; Ruys, Titia P.E; Johnson, Mark R; Gumbiene, Lina; Frogoudaki, Alexandra A; Sorour, Khaled A; Iserin, Laurence; Ladouceur, Magalie; Van Oppen, A. Carla C; Hall, Roger; Roos-Hesselink, Jolien W (2015). "Atrial Fibrillation or Flutter During Pregnancy in Patients with Structural Heart Disease". JACC: Clinical Electrophysiology. 1 (4): 284–292. doi:10.1016/j.jacep.2015.04.013. PMID 29759316.
  - Van Hagen, Iris M; Roos-Hesselink, Jolien W; Ruys, Titia P.E; Merz, Waltraut M; Goland, Sorel; Gabriel, Harald; Lelonek, Malgorzata; Trojnarska, Olga; Al Mahmeed, Wael Abdulrahman; Balint, Hajnalka Olga; Ashour, Zeinab; Baumgartner, Helmut; Boersma, Eric; Johnson, Mark R; Hall, Roger; ROPAC Investigators the EURObservational Research Programme (EORP) Team (2015). "Pregnancy in Women with a Mechanical Heart ValveCLINICAL PERSPECTIVE". Circulation. 132 (2): 132–142. doi:10.1161/CIRCULATIONAHA.115.015242. PMID 26100109.
