= El Husseiniya =

City in Sharqia, Egypt

El Husseiniya Pr-Wȝḏy.t الحسينية
- Town
- Location in Egypt
- Country: Egypt
- Governorate: Sharqia

Area
  - Total: 25.2 km^{2} (9.7 sq mi)
- Elevation: 3 m (9.8 ft)

Population (2023)
  - Total: 54,185
  - Density: 2,150/km^{2} (5,570/sq mi)
- Time zone: UTC+2 (EET)
  - Summer (DST): UTC+3 (EEST)

El Husseiniya (Arabic: الحسينية) is a city located in the Sharqia Governorate, Egypt. It was named after Sultan Hussein Kamel.

== History ==
The modern city occupies a place of the ancient town Buto (Ancient Egyptian: Pr-Wȝḏy.t, "the house of Wadjet", Ancient Greek: Βουτω). The city consists of many Roman, Greek and Egyptian antiquities.

== Geography ==
The Markaz (administrative division) is 318.5 square kilometers.

=== Climate ===
Summer average temperatures are a low of 22 °C and a high of 33 °C. In the winter, the province experiences some rain.
