= El Qanayat =

El Qanayat قسم القنايات
- Town
- Location in Egypt
- Coordinates: 30°37′08″N 31°27′42″E
- Country: Egypt
- Governorate: Sharqia

Area
  - Total: 17.9 km^{2} (6.9 sq mi)
- Elevation: 14 m (46 ft)

Population (2023)
  - Total: 75,621
  - Density: 4,220/km^{2} (10,900/sq mi)
- Time zone: UTC+2 (EET)
  - Summer (DST): UTC+3 (EEST)

El Qanayat (Arabic: قسم القنايات) is a town in the Sharqia Governorate of Egypt, located in the northeastern Nile Delta. It serves as a northwestern suburb of Zagazig.

== Demographics ==
As of 2023, El Qanayat had an estimated population of 75,621 residents. The town grew out of an agricultural village. The city has seen gradual urbanization, with small-scale industries and services emerging alongside traditional farming.

Census Population
1996	2006	2018	2023
36,010	42,563	65,172	75,621
