= Hihya =

Hihya ههيا
- City
- Location in Egypt
- Coordinates: 30.6687°N 31.5904°E
- Country: Egypt
- Governorate: Sharqia

Area
  - Total: 117.4 km^{2} (45.3 sq mi)
- Elevation: 10 m (33 ft)

Population (2021)
  - Total: 317,772
  - Density: 2,707/km^{2} (7,010/sq mi)
- Time zone: UTC+2 (EET)
  - Summer (DST): UTC+3 (EEST)

Hihya (Arabic: ههيا) is a city in the Sharqia Governorate, Egypt. It had a population of 66,702 in the 2017 census.

The 1885 Egyptian census classified Hihya as a nahiyah in the district of Sawaleh in Sharqia Governorate; at that time, the population of the city was 4,011 (2,009 men and 2,002 women).

== Notable people ==
- Sama El Masry, an Egyptian dancer.

== See also ==
- List of cities and towns in Egypt
