= Abu Hammad =

City in Sharqia Governorate, Egypt

Abu Hammad أبو حماد
- City
- Location within Nile Delta Location within Egypt
- Coordinates: 30°32′40″N 31°40′47″E
- Country: Egypt
- Governorate: Sharqia
- Markaze: Abu Hammad

Area
  - Total: 4.63 km^{2} (1.79 sq mi)
- Elevation: 228 m (748 ft)

Population (2023)
  - Total: 46,004
  - Density: 9,940/km^{2} (25,700/sq mi)
- Time zone: UTC+2 (EET)
  - Summer (DST): UTC+3 (EEST)

Abu Hammad (Arabic: أبو حماد) is a city and the administrative center of Abu Hammad Markaz, Sharqia Governorate, Egypt. It is located about 17 kilometers southeast of the governorate capital Zagazig, and has an average elevation of 228 meters above the sea level. As of 2023, it had a total population of 46,004 .

== Climate ==
Abu Hammad has a Hot Desert Climate (BWh). It sees the most rainfall in February, with 7 mm of average precipitation; and virtually no rainfall from May to September.

Climate data for Abu Hammad
Month	Jan	Feb	Mar	Apr	May	Jun	Jul	Aug	Sep	Oct	Nov	Dec	Year
Mean daily maximum °C (°F)	19.5 (67.1)	21.2 (70.2)	25.0 (77.0)	28.9 (84.0)	33.1 (91.6)	35.9 (96.6)	36.7 (98.1)	36.4 (97.5)	34.5 (94.1)	30.7 (87.3)	25.9 (78.6)	21.3 (70.3)	29.1 (84.4)
Daily mean °C (°F)	13.8 (56.8)	14.9 (58.8)	17.7 (63.9)	21.0 (69.8)	24.8 (76.6)	27.6 (81.7)	28.9 (84.0)	29.0 (84.2)	27.3 (81.1)	24.0 (75.2)	19.7 (67.5)	15.5 (59.9)	22.0 (71.6)
Mean daily minimum °C (°F)	8.5 (47.3)	9.1 (48.4)	10.9 (51.6)	13.4 (56.1)	16.9 (62.4)	19.8 (67.6)	21.7 (71.1)	22.3 (72.1)	20.9 (69.6)	18.1 (64.6)	14.2 (57.6)	10.5 (50.9)	15.5 (59.9)
Average rainfall mm (inches)	6 (0.2)	7 (0.3)	4 (0.2)	2 (0.1)	0 (0)	0 (0)	0 (0)	0 (0)	0 (0)	2 (0.1)	3 (0.1)	4 (0.2)	28 (1.2)
Source: Climate-Data.org
