= Diyarb Negm =

- City
- Location in Egypt
- Coordinates: 30°45′05″N 31°27′28″E
- Country: Egypt
- Governorate: Sharqia Governorate

Area
  - Total: 89.5 sq mi (231.9 km^{2})
- Elevation: 36 ft (11 m)

Population (2023)
  - Total: 535,822
  - Density: 5,984/sq mi (2,311/km^{2})
- Time zone: UTC+2 (EET)
  - Summer (DST): UTC+3 (EEST)

Diyarb Negm (Arabic: ديرب نجم, lit. 'The Home of Najm al-Din Ayyub') is one of the oldest centers and the seat of a markaz, markaz Diyarb Negm of the Sharqia Governorate of Egypt .

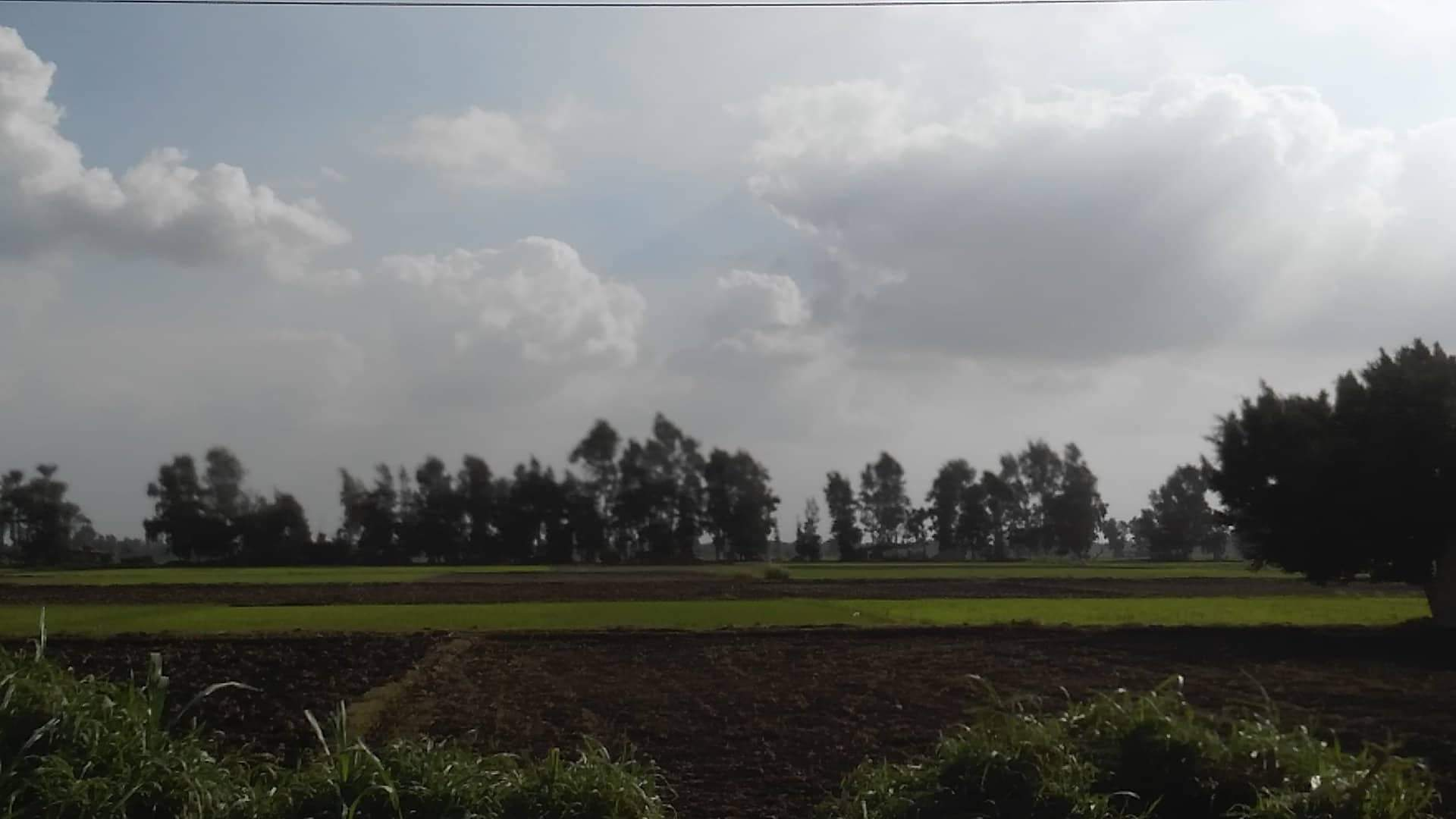
Farms in Diyrab Negm

The village of Saft Zurayq (صفط زريق ) is one of the important villages of the city.

== History ==
Its origins: This area is called Deyarb Najm, named after Najm al-Din Ayyub, who camped with his soldiers in this area during the Crusades. The people of the region expressed all assistance and support to the commander and his soldiers. This place is called at this time “Diyar Bani Najm,” then it was corrupted to “Deyarb Najm.” It is called “Deyarb Najm.” Formerly in Dar Najm Bani, where Najm al-Din camped in Sharqiya.

Ali Mubarak mentioned it in his book The Alliance, where he mentioned it from the villages of the Dakahlia Governorate, El Senbellawein District.

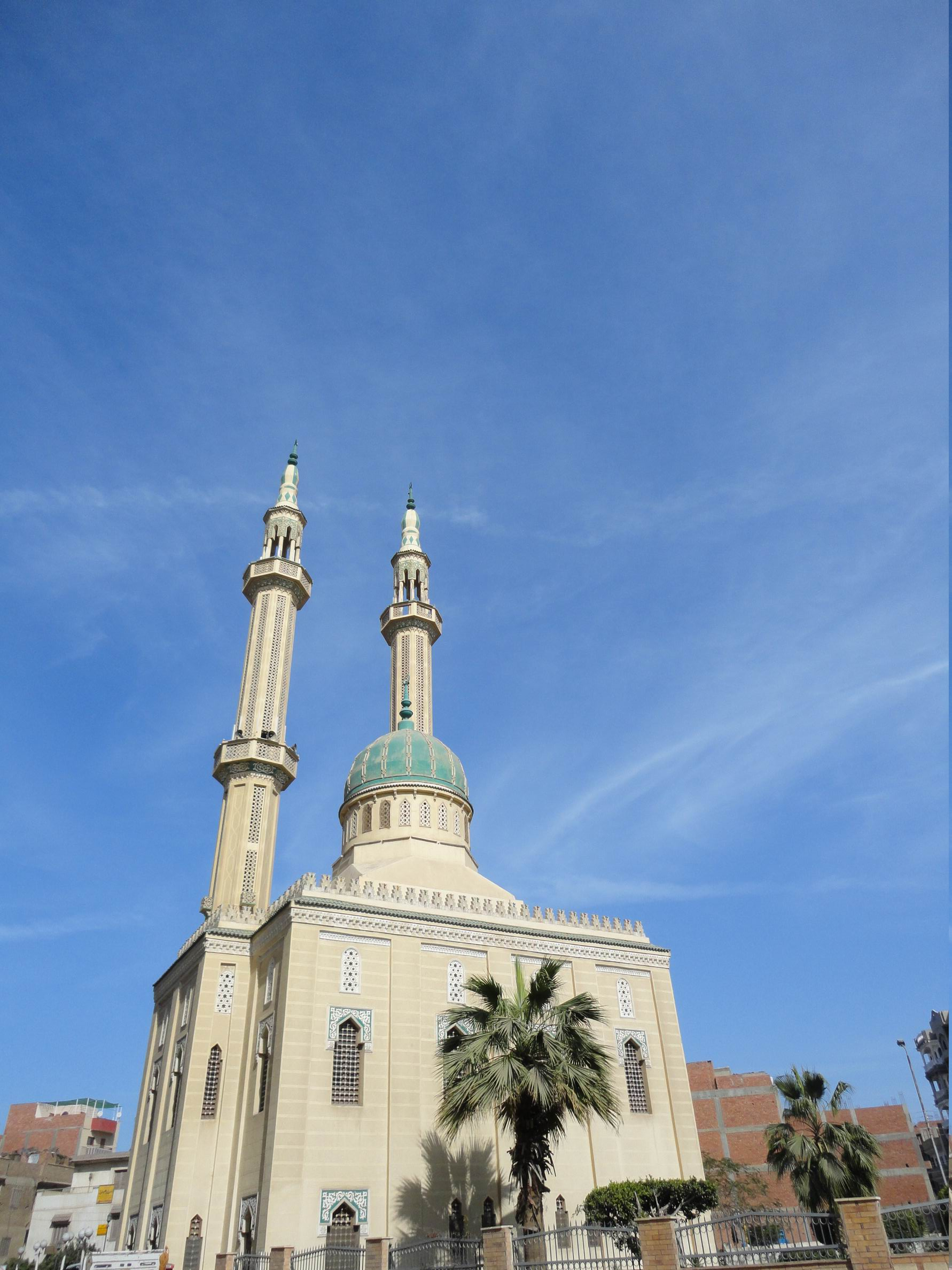
Al Fath Mosque

== Sport ==
The city has two football teams: Diyarb Negm SC and MS Diarb Negm.

== Notable people ==
- Dalal Abdel Aziz, Egyptian actress
- Ahmad Belal, Egyptian Footballer
- Mohamed Helmy, Egyptian Footballer

== See also ==
- List of cities and towns in Egypt
