= El Qurein =

El Qurein القرين
- City
- Location in Egypt
- Coordinates: 30°36′58″N 31°44′07″E
- Country: Egypt
- Governorate: Sharqia

Area
  - Total: 23.6 km^{2} (9.1 sq mi)
- Elevation: 26 m (85 ft)

Population (2023)
  - Total: 101,238
  - Density: 4,290/km^{2} (11,100/sq mi)
- Time zone: UTC+2 (EET)
  - Summer (DST): UTC+3 (EEST)

El Qurein (Arabic: القرين) is a city in the Sharqia Governorate of Egypt. As of 2023, it had an estimated population of 101,238.

== Geography ==
El Qurein is located at 30.6128°N 31.7336°E. It has an average elevation of 26 metres (85 feet).
