= Abu Kebir, Egypt =

City in the Sharqia Governorate, Egypt

Abu Kebir أبو كبير
- Location in Egypt
- Coordinates: 30°43′N 31°40′E
- Country: Egypt
- Governorate: Sharqia Governorate

Area
  - Total: 29.4 km^{2} (11.4 sq mi)
- Elevation: 17 m (56 ft)

Population (2023)
  - Total: 165,246
  - Density: 5,620/km^{2} (14,600/sq mi)
- Time zone: UTC+2 (EET)
  - Summer (DST): UTC+3 (EEST)

Abu Kebir (Arabic: أبو كبير) is a city in the Sharqia Governorate of Egypt.

Successive census results indicate a considerable steady rise in its population - 68,394 in 1986, 85,339 in 1996, 103,175 in 2006, 142,420 (estimated) in 2018 and 165,246 (estimated) in 2023.

Abu Kebir is a city located in Al Sharkia Governorate in the north of Egypt, 80km from Cairo capital. Among its figures are chemist Mostafa El-Sayed and football player Ahmed Salama.

It is well known for its rural suburbs with some distinctive agricultural crops as well as the urban area and markets in the city center.

== Climate ==
Köppen-Geiger climate classification system classifies its climate as hot desert (BWh).

Climate data for Abu Kebir
Month	Jan	Feb	Mar	Apr	May	Jun	Jul	Aug	Sep	Oct	Nov	Dec	Year
Mean daily maximum °C (°F)	18 (64)	19.4 (66.9)	22.5 (72.5)	26.5 (79.7)	31.1 (88.0)	33.2 (91.8)	33.3 (91.9)	33.3 (91.9)	31.6 (88.9)	29.1 (84.4)	24.5 (76.1)	19.9 (67.8)	26.9 (80.3)
Daily mean °C (°F)	12.3 (54.1)	13.4 (56.1)	15.9 (60.6)	19.3 (66.7)	23.4 (74.1)	26 (79)	27 (81)	26.9 (80.4)	25.2 (77.4)	22.9 (73.2)	19.1 (66.4)	14.3 (57.7)	20.5 (68.9)
Mean daily minimum °C (°F)	6.7 (44.1)	7.4 (45.3)	9.4 (48.9)	12.2 (54.0)	15.7 (60.3)	18.8 (65.8)	20.7 (69.3)	20.6 (69.1)	18.8 (65.8)	16.8 (62.2)	13.8 (56.8)	8.7 (47.7)	14.1 (57.4)
Average precipitation mm (inches)	11 (0.4)	6 (0.2)	6 (0.2)	3 (0.1)	2 (0.1)	0 (0)	0 (0)	0 (0)	0 (0)	4 (0.2)	7 (0.3)	7 (0.3)	46 (1.8)
Source: Climate-Data.org
