= Faqous =

Faqous فاقوس Fāqūs
- City
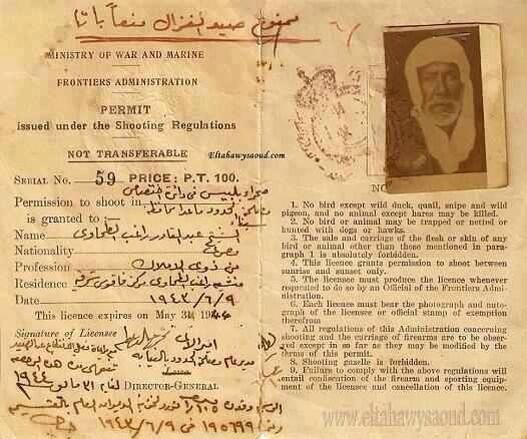
- Egyptian shooting permit issued from Faqous in 1943

- Location in Egypt
- Coordinates: 30.72816°N 31.79697°E
- Country: Egypt
- Governorate: Ash Sharqiyah Governorate

Area
  - Total: 10.78 km^{2} (4.16 sq mi)
- Elevation: 13 m (43 ft)

Population (2021)
  - Total: 116,945
  - Density: 10,850/km^{2} (28,100/sq mi)
- Time zone: UTC+2 (EET)
  - Summer (DST): UTC+3 (EEST)
- Area codes: 2055397, 2055398, 2055394

Faqus (Arabic: فاقوس Fāqūs) is a city in the Egyptian governorate of Ash Sharqiyah Governorate. Local attractions include ancient Egyptian monuments in Tell el-Dab'a, Qantir, and Omm Egrim.

== History ==
Faqus is identical with the ancient city of Phacusa (Ancient Greek: Φάκουσα Phákousa), which was the capital of the nome of Arabia. It was subsequently mentioned by the medieval geographers Qudama ibn Ja'far, Ibn Khordadbeh, Maqrizi, Istakhri, Ibn Hawqal, and al-Muqaddasi.

The 1885 Census of Egypt recorded Faqus as a nahiyah under the district of Sawaleh in Gharbia Governorate; at that time, the population of the town was 1,610 (836 men and 774 women).

== Demographics ==
Historical population
Year	Pop.	±%
1996	64,266	—
2006	78,405	+22.0%
2017	104,244	+33.0%
2021	116,945	+12.2%
Source: www.citypopulation.de

== Notable people ==
- Abdullah al-Sharqawi
- Yusuf Idris

== See also ==
- List of cities and towns in Egypt
