= Sharqia Governorate =

Governorate of Egypt

Sharqia Governorate محافظة الشرقية
- Governorate
- Flag Seal

- Sharqia Governorate on the map of Egypt
- Coordinates: 30.7°N 31.63°E
- Country: Egypt
- Seat: Zagazig (capital)

Government
  - Governor: Shazem El-Ashmouni

Area
  - Total: 4,180 km^{2} (1,610 sq mi)

Population (January 2023)
  - Total: 7,859,068
  - Density: 1,880/km^{2} (4,870/sq mi)

GDP
  - Total: EGP 302 billion (US$ 19.2 billion)
- Time zone: UTC+2 (EGY)
  - Summer (DST): UTC+3 (EEST)
- HDI (2021): 0.73 high · 14th
- Website: www.sharkia.gov.eg

Sharqia (Arabic: محافظة الشرقية, romanized: Moḥāfeẓeh esh-Sher'eyyeh, Egyptian Arabic pronunciation: [eʃ.ʃæɾˈʔejjæ], rural: [eʃ.ʃæɾˈɡejje]; lit. 'Governorate of the Eastern') is one of the 27 governorates of Egypt, and the third most populous one. It is located in Lower Egypt on the eastern side of the Nile Delta. Its capital is the city of Zagazig. Sharqia, along with the rest of the eastern portion of the Nile Delta, it is often identified with the Biblical Land of Goshen.

== Overview ==
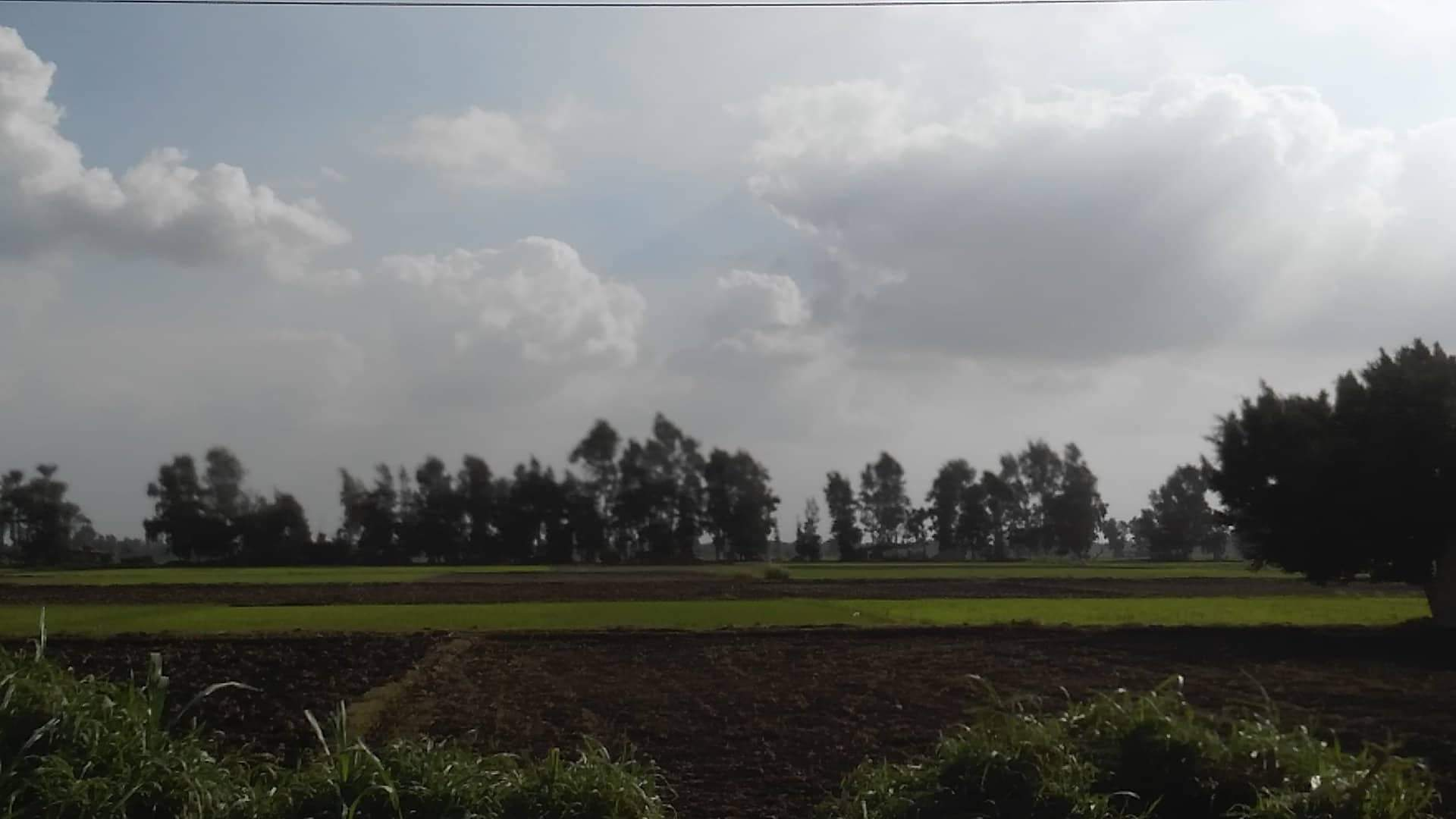
Farms in Diarb Negm

The capital of the governorate is Zagazig and Sharqia has a strong industrial and agricultural sector.

Sharqia is the third most populous governorate in Egypt and is considered the birthplace of many historical leaders and figures in Egypt.

== Municipal divisions ==
The governorate is divided into the following municipal divisions for administrative purposes, with a total estimated population as of January 2023 of 7,021,046. In some instances there is a markaz and a kism with the same name.

Municipal divisions
Anglicized name	Native name	Arabic transliteration	Population (January 2023 est.)	Type
Abu Hammad	مركز أبو حماد	Abū Ḥammād	465,376	Markaz
Abu Kebir	مركز أبو كبير	Abū Kabīr	491,984	Markaz
El Husseiniya	مركز الحسينية	El-Ḥusayniya	373,774	Markaz
El Ibrahimiya	مركز الأبراهيمية	El-Ibrāhīmiya	200,590	Markaz
El Qanayat	قسم القنايات	El-Qanāyāt	74,611	Kism (fully urban)
El Qurein	قسم القرين	El-Qurayn	99,884	Kism (fully urban)
New Salhia	قسم الصالحية الجديدة	Eṣ-Ṣaliḥiyah el-Jedīda	62,610	Kism (fully urban)
Awlad Saqr	مركز أولاد صقر	Awlād Ṣaqr	244,870	Markaz
Zagazig 1	قسم اول الزقازيق	Ez-Zaqāzīq 1	208,682	Kism (fully urban)
Zagazig 2	قسم ثان الزقازيق	Ez-Zaqāzīq 2	245,662	Kism (fully urban)
Zagazig	مركز الزقازيق	Ez-Zaqāzīq	933,504	Markaz
Bilbeis	مركز بلبيس	Bilbays	889,709	Markaz
Diyarb Negm	مركز ديرب نجم	Diyarb Najm	532,950	Markaz
Faqous	قسم فاقوس	Fāqūs	104,244	Kism (fully urban)
Faqous	مركز فاقوس	Fāqūs	654,084	Markaz
Hihya	مركز ههيا	Hihyā	326,627	Markaz
Kafr Saqr	مركز كفر صقر	Kafr Ṣaqr	302,084	Markaz
10th of Ramadan City 1	قسم أول مدينة عشرة رمضان	Madīnat 'Ashirh min-Ramaḍān 1	87,808	Kism (fully urban)
10th of Ramadan City 2	قسم ثان مدينة عشرة رمضان	Madīnat 'Ashirh min-Ramaḍān 2	171,997	Kism (fully urban)
Mashtool El Souk	مركز مشتول السوق	Mashtūl es-Sūq	241,857	Markaz
Minya El Qamh	مركز منيا القمح	Minyā el-Qamḥ	831,505	Markaz
Minshat Abu Omar	مركز منشاه ابوعمر	Munshāh Abū 'Umar	86,670	Markaz
Tanis	مركز صان الحجر	Ṣān el-Ḥajar	158,443	Markaz

== Population ==
According to population estimates, in 2015 the majority of residents in the governorate lived in rural areas, with an urbanization rate of 25%. Out of an estimated 6,485,412 people residing in the governorate in 2015, 4,987,707 people lived in rural areas and 1,497,705 lived in urban areas.

== Industrial zones ==
According to the Governing Authority for Investment and Free Zones (GAFI), the following industrial zones are located in Sharqia:

Zone name
10th of Ramadan Industrial Zone
New El Salhia Industrial Zone

== Cities and towns ==
The following cities and towns are located in Sharqia Governorate.

Name	Population (2006 census)	Location
10th of Ramadan	29,601	30.306503°N 31.741455°E
Abu Hammad	36,592	30.544376°N 31.679831°E
Abu Kebir	104,100	30.716667°N 31.666667°E
Awlad Saqr	19,515	30.9303418°N 31.6974966°E
Bilbeis	141,285	30.416667°N 31.566667°E
Diyarb Negm	52,611	30.751389°N 31.457778°E
El Husseiniya	29,565	30.8610931°N 31.919806°E
El Ibrahimiya	35,022	30.7183986°N 31.5630861°E
El Qurein	64,559	30.601771°N 31.744135°E
Faqous	73,081	30.733333°N 31.8°E
Hihya	43,672	30.668702°N 31.5904°E
Kafr Saqr	30,004	30.796389°N 31.626111°E
Mashtool El Souk	47,153	30.360556°N 31.3775°E
Minya El Qamh	67,450	30.515278°N 31.346111°E
El Salheya El Gedida	9,350	30.629774°N 31.941019°E
Qanayat	75,000	30.615239°N 31.459733°E
Zagazig	318,393	30.566667°N 31.5°E

== Notable people ==
- Ramses II, Egyptian pharaoh
- El-Said Badawi, sociolinguist
- Mohamed Morsi, former President of Egypt
- Ahmed Shafik, former Prime Minister of Egypt and Presidential Candidate for the 2012 Egyptian presidential election
- The Abaza Family, Egypt's largest aristocratic family of Circassian Abazin origin.
- Mohammed Ahmed Sadek, army general
- Ahmed Subhy Mansour, founder of the Quranist movement
- Sayed Marei, engineer and politician
- Abdel Halim Hafez, popular singer and actor
- Miral al-Tahawy, award-winning Bedouin novelist
- Yusuf Abu Rayya, award-winning novelist
- Husayn Fawzi Al Najjar, political historian and Islamic scholar
- Magdi Yacoub, professor of cardiothoracic surgery
- Ahmed Fouad Negm, vernacular poet
- Rushdy Abaza, actor
- Fekry Pasha Abaza, journalist and political activist
- Ahmed 'Urabi, the leader of the 1881 nationalist uprising against the British
- Hamada Helal, singer
- Mounira El Mahdeya, singer and actress
- Emad Moteab, footballer
- Ahmed el-Mansy, an officer who was killed in clashes with terrorists in North Sinai
- Aly Saad, professor of cardiology
