= List of towns and cities with 100,000 or more inhabitants/country: T-U-V-W-Y-Z =

This is a list of towns and cities in the world believed to have 100,000 or more inhabitants, sorted by countries beginning with letters between T and Z. Unless otherwise noted, populations are based on United Nations estimates from 2022.

Index

A-B • C-D-E-F • G-H-I-J-K • L-M-N-O • P-Q-R-S • T-U-V-W-Y-Z
Back to main page

== Taiwan ==
City	County/City	Population (2020)
Changhua	Changhua	231,300
Chiayi	Chiayi City	266,000
Douliu	Yunlin	108,700
Hsinchu	Hsinchu	451,400
Hualien	Hualien	102,500
Kaohsiung	Kaohsiung	2,765,900
Keelung	Keelung	367,600
New Taipei	New Taipei	4,031,000
Pingtung	Pingtung	197,600
Taichung	Taichung	2,820,800
Tainan	Tainan	1,874,900
Taipei	Taipei	2,602,400
Taitung	Taitung	104,800
Taoyuan	Taoyuan	2,268,800
Toufen	Miaoli	104,400
Yuanlin	Changhua	124,300
Zhubei	Hsinchu	200,800

== Tajikistan ==
Name	Region	Population
Bokhtar	Khatlon	135,800
Dushanbe	Dushanbe	1,564,200
Khujand	Sughd	208,600
Kulob	Khatlon	112,700

== Tanzania ==
Name	Region	Population
Dar es Salaam	Dar es Salaam	4,364,500
Mwanza	Mwanza	706,545
Arusha	Arusha	416,442
Dodoma	Dodoma	410,955
Morogoro	Morogoro	315,865
Tanga	Tanga	273,330
Mbeya	Mbeya	270,740
Kasulu	Kigoma	234,452
Kigoma	Kigoma	215,458
Zanzibar City	Zanzibar	206,290
Songea	Ruvuma	203,309
Moshi	Kilimanjaro	201,150
Tabora	Tabora	160,608
Iringa	Iringa	151,345
Musoma	Mara	134,327
Bukoba	Kagera	128,796
Sumbawanga	Rukwa	124,204
Shinyanga	Shinyanga	107,360

== Thailand ==
Name	Province	Population
Bangkok	Bangkok	5,588,222
Nonthaburi	Nonthaburi	251,026
Pak Kret	Nonthaburi	189,458
Hat Yai	Songkhla	149,459
Chaophraya Surasak	Chonburi	146,474
Surat Thani	Surat Thani	131,599
Nakhon Ratchasima	Nakhon Ratchasima	122,730
Chiang Mai	Chiang Mai	122,627
Udon Thani	Udon Thani	120,222
Pattaya	Chonburi	117,606
Khon Kaen	Khon Kaen	110,615
Nakhon Si Thammarat	Nakhon Si Thammarat	100,416

== Togo ==
Name	Region	Population (2022)
Lomé	Maritime	1,500,000

== Tunisia ==
Name	Governorate	Population (2023)
Tunis	Tunis	599,368
Sfax	Sfax	286,636
Sousse	Sousse	250,540
La Soukra	Ariana	153,307
Kairouan	Kairouan	138,947
Bizerte	Bizerte	138,430
Sidi Hassine	Tunis	130,255
Ariana	Ariana	123,079
El Mourouj	Ben Arous	120,732
Gabès	Gabès	107,634
Monastir	Monastir	107,127
La Marsa	Tunis	101,601

== Turkey ==
Name	Province	Population (2021)
Adana	Adana	1,797,136
Ceyhan	Adana	159,955
Kozan	Adana	132,320
Adıyaman	Adıyaman	267,131
Afyonkarahisar	Afyonkarahisar	251,799
Ağrı	Ağrı	120,390
Aksaray	Aksaray	247,147
Amasya	Amasya	114,921
Ankara	Ankara	5,156,573
Polatlı	Ankara	127,526
Alanya	Antalya	350,636
Antalya	Antalya	1,462,129
Manavgat	Antalya	245,740
Serik	Antalya	134,953
Aydın	Aydın	300,225
Kuşadası	Aydın	125,812
Nazilli	Aydın	160,581
Söke	Aydın	122,708
Balıkesir	Balıkesir	370,156
Bandırma	Balıkesir	161,894
Edremit	Balıkesir	164,696
Batman	Batman	452,157
Bingöl	Bingöl	128,935
Bolu	Bolu	184,682
Bursa	Bursa	2,227,857
Gemlik	Bursa	118,037
İnegöl	Bursa	286,848
Mudanya	Bursa	105,308
Mustafakemalpaşa	Bursa	101,407
Çanakkale	Çanakkale	143,622
Çorum	Çorum	267,396
Denizli	Denizli	677,072
Diyarbakır	Diyarbakır	1,129,218
Bismil	Diyarbakır	118,592
Ergani	Diyarbakır	135,514
Düzce	Düzce	188,928
Edirne	Edirne	174,662
Elazığ	Elazığ	381,158
Erzincan	Erzincan	149,274
Erzurum	Erzurum	428,302
Eskişehir	Eskişehir	797,708
Nizip	Gaziantep	147,865
Gaziantep	Gaziantep	1,775,904
Giresun	Giresun	122,787
Antakya	Hatay	555,833
İskenderun	Hatay	350,456
Dörtyol	Hatay	127,989
Kırıkhan	Hatay	119,854
Reyhanlı	Hatay	105,309
Samandağ	Hatay	123,999
Isparta	Isparta	245,784
Istanbul	Istanbul	15,514,128
Silivri	Istanbul	209,014
İzmir	İzmir	2,959,355
Aliağa	İzmir	103,364
Bergama	İzmir	104,980
Kemalpaşa	İzmir	112,049
Menderes	İzmir	104,147
Menemen	İzmir	193,229
Ödemiş	İzmir	132,769
Torbalı	İzmir	201,476
Kahramanmaraş	Kahramanmaraş	671,849
Elbistan	Kahramanmaraş	141,977
Karabük	Karabük	123,309
Karaman	Karaman	172,683
Kastamonu	Kastamonu	125,622
Kayseri	Kayseri	1,175,886
Kilis	Kilis	108,984
Kırıkkale	Kırıkkale	188,769
Lüleburgaz	Kırklareli	123,889
Kırşehir	Kırşehir	148,207
İzmit	Kocaeli	1,105,780
Gebze	Kocaeli	815,795
Ereğli	Konya	149,333
Konya	Konya	1,390,051
Kütahya	Kütahya	258,592
Malatya	Malatya	641,799
Manisa	Manisa	425,654
Akhisar	Manisa	176,000
Alaşehir	Manisa	105,380
Salihli	Manisa	164,710
Soma	Manisa	111,218
Turgutlu	Manisa	172,413
Mardin	Mardin	186,622
Kızıltepe	Mardin	263,938
Midyat	Mardin	118,625
Nusaybin	Mardin	113,728
Mersin	Mersin	1,064,850
Tarsus	Mersin	347,314
Silifke	Mersin	127,849
Erdemli	Mersin	147,512
Muğla	Muğla	118,443
Bodrum	Muğla	187,284
Fethiye	Muğla	170,379
Milas	Muğla	145,275
Muş	Muş	116,070
Nevşehir	Nevşehir	120,599
Niğde	Niğde	166,511
Ordu	Ordu	229,214
Fatsa	Ordu	124,255
Ünye	Ordu	130,692
Osmaniye	Osmaniye	247,276
Rize	Rize	119,828
Sakarya	Sakarya	577,365
Samsun	Samsun	733,861
Bafra	Samsun	142,341
Çarşamba	Samsun	140,439
Urfa	Şanlıurfa	1,031,664
Akçakale	Şanlıurfa	120,834
Siverek	Şanlıurfa	266,971
Suruç	Şanlıurfa	101,178
Viranşehir	Şanlıurfa	205,380
Siirt	Siirt	160,340
Cizre	Şırnak	130,190
Silopi	Şırnak	103,381
Sivas	Sivas	362,002
Tekirdağ	Tekirdağ	210,547
Çerkezköy	Tekirdağ	327,549
Çorlu	Tekirdağ	350,935
Tokat	Tokat	161,169
Trabzon	Trabzon	350,935
Uşak	Uşak	232,819
Van	Van	631,827
Erçiş	Van	173,606
Yalova	Yalova	135,355
Ereğli	Zonguldak	121,439
Zonguldak	Zonguldak	165,325

== Turkmenistan ==
Name	Region	Population
Ashgabat	Ashgabat	1,000,000
Daşoguz	Daşoguz	210,000
Mary	Mary	123,000
Türkmenabat	Lebap	254,000

== Uganda ==
Name	Region	Population
Kampala	Central Region	1,507,080
Nansana	Central Region	365,124
Kira	Central Region	317,157
Ssabagabo	Central Region	283,272
Mbarara	Western Region	195,531
Mukono	Central Region	162,710
Njeru	Central Region	159,549
Gulu	Northern Region	150,306
Lugazi	Central Region	114,524
Mubende	Central Region	103,473
Masaka	Central Region	103,227
Kasese	Western Region	101,065
Hoima	Western Region	100,099

== Ukraine ==
Name	Region	Population (2021)
Alchevsk	Luhansk Oblast	106,550
Berdiansk	Zaporizhzhia Oblast	107,928
Bila Tserkva	Kyiv Oblast	208,737
Brovary	Kyiv Oblast	109,473
Cherkasy	Cherkasy Oblast	272,651
Chernihiv	Chernihiv Oblast	285,234
Chernivtsi	Chernivtsi Oblast	265,471
Dnipro	Dnipropetrovsk Oblast	980,948
Donetsk	Donetsk Oblast	905,364
Horlivka	Donetsk Oblast	241,106
Ivano-Frankivsk	Ivano-Frankivsk Oblast	237,855
Kamianske	Dnipropetrovsk Oblast	229,794
Kerch	Autonomous Republic of Crimea	149,566
Kharkiv	Kharkiv Oblast	1,433,886
Kherson	Kherson Oblast	283,649
Khmelnytskyi	Khmelnytskyi Oblast	274,582
Kramatorsk	Donetsk Oblast	164,700
Kremenchuk	Poltava Oblast	217,710
Kropyvnytskyi	Kirovohrad Oblast	222,695
Kryvyi Rih	Dnipropetrovsk Oblast	646,748
Kyiv	Kyiv	2,962,180
Luhansk	Luhansk Oblast	399,559
Lutsk	Volyn Oblast	217,197
Lviv	Lviv Oblast	717,486
Makiivka	Donetsk Oblast	340,337
Mariupol	Donetsk Oblast	431,859
Melitopol	Zaporizhzhia Oblast	150,768
Mykolaiv	Mykolaiv Oblast	476,101
Nikopol	Dnipropetrovsk Oblast	107,464
Odesa	Odesa Oblast	1,015,826
Pavlohrad	Dnipropetrovsk Oblast	103,073
Poltava	Poltava Oblast	283,402
Rivne	Rivne Oblast	245,289
Sevastopol	Sevastopol	509,992
Sievierodonetsk	Luhansk Oblast	101,135
Simferopol	Autonomous Republic of Crimea	332,317
Sloviansk	Donetsk Oblast	106,972
Sumy	Sumy Oblast	259,660
Ternopil	Ternopil Oblast	225,238
Uzhhorod	Zakarpattia Oblast	115,442
Vinnytsia	Vinnytsia Oblast	370,601
Yevpatoria	Autonomous Republic of Crimea	105,719
Zaporizhzhia	Zaporizhzhia Oblast	722,713
Zhytomyr	Zhytomyr Oblast	263,507

== United Arab Emirates ==
Name	Emirate	Population
Abu Dhabi	Abu Dhabi	1,807,000
Ajman	Ajman	238,000
Al Ain	Abu Dhabi	767,000
Dubai	Dubai	3,137,500
Sharjah	Sharjah	1,400,000

== United Kingdom ==
Name	Country	Population
Aberdeen	Scotland	196,670
Basildon	England	185,862
Belfast	Northern Ireland	340,200
Birmingham	England	1,141,000
Blackburn	England	148,942
Blackpool	England	139,720
Bolton	England	285,372
Bournemouth	England	183,491
Bradford	England	537,173
Brighton	England	290,395
Bristol	England	463,405
Cambridge	England	125,758
Cardiff	Wales	362,800
Carlisle	England	107,524
Chelmsford	England	177,079
Cheltenham	England	117,090
Colchester	England	192,523
Coventry	England	366,785
Crawley	England	112,448
Darlington	England	106,566
Derby	England	257,174
Doncaster	England	310,542
Dundee	Scotland	148,750
Edinburgh	Scotland	488,000
Exeter	England	130,428
Gateshead	England	202,508
Glasgow	Scotland	621,000
Gloucester	England	129,285
High Wycombe	England	125,257
Huddersfield	England	143,200
Hull	England	260,645
Ipswich	England	137,532
Lancaster	England	138,375
Leeds	England	789,194
Leicester	England	355,218
Liverpool	England	494,815
London	England	8,817,000
Luton	England	214,109
Manchester	England	547,625
Middlesbrough	England	169,955
Milton Keynes	England	268,607
Newcastle	England	300,196
Newport	Wales	153,302
Northampton	England	225,146
Norwich	England	141,137
Nottingham	England	331,069
Oldham	England	235,623
Oxford	England	154,327
Peterborough	England	201,041
Plymouth	England	263,100
Poole	England	151,500
Portsmouth	England	215,133
Preston	England	141,818
Reading	England	163,203
Rotherham	England	264,671
Rochdale	England	220,001
Saint Albans	England	140,644
Saint Helens	England	180,049
Salford	England	254,408
Sale	England	134,022
Sheffield	England	582,506
Slough	England	149,112
Solihull	England	214,909
Southampton	England	252,796
Southend	England	182,463
Stockport	England	291,775
Stoke	England	255,833
Sunderland	England	277,417
Swansea	Wales	246,466
Swindon	England	221,996
Telford	England	177,799
Wakefield	England	325,837
Warrington	England	209,547
Wigan	England	326,088
Winchester	England	116,595
Wolverhampton	England	262,008
Worcester	England	101,891
Wrexham	Wales	134,844
York	England	209,895

== United States ==
Name	State	Population (2020)
New York	New York	8,804,190
Los Angeles	California	3,898,747
Chicago	Illinois	2,746,388
Houston	Texas	2,304,580
Phoenix	Arizona	1,608,139
Philadelphia	Pennsylvania	1,603,797
San Antonio	Texas	1,434,625
San Diego	California	1,386,932
Dallas	Texas	1,304,379
San Jose	California	1,013,240
Austin	Texas	961,855
Jacksonville	Florida	949,611
Fort Worth	Texas	918,915
Columbus	Ohio	905,748
Indianapolis	Indiana	887,642
Charlotte	North Carolina	874,579
San Francisco	California	873,965
Seattle	Washington	737,015
Denver	Colorado	715,522
Washington	District of Columbia	689,545
Nashville	Tennessee	689,447
Oklahoma City	Oklahoma	681,054
El Paso	Texas	678,815
Boston	Massachusetts	675,647
Portland	Oregon	652,503
Las Vegas	Nevada	641,903
Detroit	Michigan	639,111
Memphis	Tennessee	633,104
Louisville	Kentucky	633,045
Baltimore	Maryland	585,708
Milwaukee	Wisconsin	577,222
Albuquerque	New Mexico	564,559
Tucson	Arizona	542,629
Fresno	California	542,107
Sacramento	California	524,943
Kansas City	Missouri	508,090
Mesa	Arizona	504,258
Atlanta	Georgia	498,715
Omaha	Nebraska	486,051
Colorado Springs	Colorado	478,961
Raleigh	North Carolina	467,665
Long Beach	California	466,742
Virginia Beach	Virginia	459,470
Miami	Florida	442,241
Oakland	California	440,646
Minneapolis	Minnesota	429,954
Tulsa	Oklahoma	413,066
Bakersfield	California	403,455
Wichita	Kansas	397,532
Arlington	Texas	394,266
Aurora	Colorado	386,261
Tampa	Florida	384,959
New Orleans	Louisiana	383,997
Cleveland	Ohio	372,624
Honolulu	Hawaii	350,964
Anaheim	California	346,824
San Juan	Puerto Rico	342,259
Lexington	Kentucky	322,570
Stockton	California	320,804
Corpus Christi	Texas	317,863
Henderson	Nevada	317,610
Riverside	California	314,998
Newark	New Jersey	311,549
Saint Paul	Minnesota	311,527
Santa Ana	California	310,227
Cincinnati	Ohio	309,317
Irvine	California	307,670
Orlando	Florida	307,573
Pittsburgh	Pennsylvania	302,971
St. Louis	Missouri	301,578
Greensboro	North Carolina	299,035
Jersey City	New Jersey	292,449
Anchorage	Alaska	291,247
Lincoln	Nebraska	291,082
Plano	Texas	285,494
Durham	North Carolina	283,506
Buffalo	New York	278,349
Chandler	Arizona	275,987
Chula Vista	California	275,487
Toledo	Ohio	270,871
Madison	Wisconsin	269,840
Gilbert	Arizona	267,918
Reno	Nevada	264,165
Fort Wayne	Indiana	263,886
North Las Vegas	Nevada	262,527
St. Petersburg	Florida	258,308
Lubbock	Texas	257,141
Irving	Texas	256,684
Laredo	Texas	255,205
Winston-Salem	North Carolina	249,545
Chesapeake	Virginia	249,422
Glendale	Arizona	248,325
Garland	Texas	246,018
Scottsdale	Arizona	241,361
Norfolk	Virginia	238,005
Boise	Idaho	235,684
Fremont	California	230,504
Spokane	Washington	228,989
Santa Clarita	California	228,673
Baton Rouge	Louisiana	227,470
Richmond	Virginia	226,610
Hialeah	Florida	223,109
San Bernardino	California	222,101
Tacoma	Washington	219,346
Modesto	California	218,464
Huntsville	Alabama	215,006
Des Moines	Iowa	214,133
Yonkers	New York	211,569
Rochester	New York	211,328
Moreno Valley	California	208,634
Fayetteville	North Carolina	208,501
Fontana	California	208,393
Columbus	Georgia	206,922
Worcester	Massachusetts	206,518
Port St. Lucie	Florida	204,851
Little Rock	Arkansas	202,591
Augusta	Georgia	202,081
Oxnard	California	202,063
Birmingham	Alabama	200,733
Montgomery	Alabama	200,603
Frisco	Texas	200,509
Amarillo	Texas	200,393
Salt Lake City	Utah	199,723
Grand Rapids	Michigan	198,917
Huntington Beach	California	198,711
Overland Park	Kansas	197,238
Glendale	California	196,543
Tallahassee	Florida	196,169
Grand Prairie	Texas	196,100
McKinney	Texas	195,308
Cape Coral	Florida	194,016
Sioux Falls	South Dakota	192,517
Peoria	Arizona	190,985
Providence	Rhode Island	190,934
Vancouver	Washington	190,915
Knoxville	Tennessee	190,740
Akron	Ohio	190,469
Shreveport	Louisiana	187,593
Mobile	Alabama	187,041
Brownsville	Texas	186,738
Newport News	Virginia	186,247
Bayamón	Puerto Rico	185,187
Fort Lauderdale	Florida	182,760
Chattanooga	Tennessee	181,099
Tempe	Arizona	180,587
Aurora	Illinois	180,542
Santa Rosa	California	178,127
Eugene	Oregon	176,654
Elk Grove	California	176,124
Salem	Oregon	175,535
Ontario	California	175,265
Cary	North Carolina	174,721
Rancho Cucamonga	California	174,453
Oceanside	California	174,068
Lancaster	California	173,516
Garden Grove	California	171,949
Pembroke Pines	Florida	171,178
Fort Collins	Colorado	169,810
Palmdale	California	169,450
Springfield	Missouri	169,176
Clarksville	Tennessee	166,722
Salinas	California	163,542
Hayward	California	162,954
Paterson	New Jersey	159,732
Alexandria	Virginia	159,467
Macon	Georgia	157,346
Corona	California	157,136
Kansas City	Kansas	156,607
Lakewood	Colorado	155,984
Springfield	Massachusetts	155,929
Sunnyvale	California	155,805
Carolina	Puerto Rico	154,815
Jackson	Mississippi	153,701
Killeen	Texas	153,095
Hollywood	Florida	153,067
Murfreesboro	Tennessee	152,769
Pasadena	Texas	151,950
Bellevue	Washington	151,854
Pomona	California	151,713
Escondido	California	151,038
Joliet	Illinois	150,362
Charleston	South Carolina	150,227
Mesquite	Texas	150,108
Naperville	Illinois	149,540
Rockford	Illinois	148,655
Bridgeport	Connecticut	148,654
Syracuse	New York	148,620
Savannah	Georgia	147,780
Roseville	California	147,773
Torrance	California	147,067
Fullerton	California	143,617
Surprise	Arizona	143,148
McAllen	Texas	142,210
Thornton	Colorado	141,867
Visalia	California	141,384
Olathe	Kansas	141,290
Gainesville	Florida	141,085
West Valley City	Utah	140,230
Orange	California	139,911
Denton	Texas	139,869
Warren	Michigan	139,387
Pasadena	California	138,699
Waco	Texas	138,486
Cedar Rapids	Iowa	137,710
Dayton	Ohio	137,644
Ponce	Puerto Rico	137,491
Elizabeth	New Jersey	137,298
Hampton	Virginia	137,148
Columbia	South Carolina	136,632
Kent	Washington	136,588
Stamford	Connecticut	135,470
Lakewood	New Jersey	135,158
Victorville	California	134,810
Miramar	Florida	134,721
Coral Springs	Florida	134,394
Sterling Heights	Michigan	134,346
New Haven	Connecticut	134,023
Carrollton	Texas	133,434
Midland	Texas	132,524
Norman	Oklahoma	128,026
Santa Clara	California	127,647
Athens	Georgia	127,315
Caguas	Puerto Rico	127,244
Thousand Oaks	California	126,966
Topeka	Kansas	126,587
Simi Valley	California	126,356
Columbia	Missouri	126,254
Vallejo	California	126,090
Fargo	North Dakota	125,990
Allentown	Pennsylvania	125,845
Pearland	Texas	125,828
Concord	California	125,410
Abilene	Texas	125,182
Arvada	Colorado	124,402
Berkeley	California	124,321
Ann Arbor	Michigan	123,851
Independence	Missouri	123,011
Rochester	Minnesota	121,395
Lafayette	Louisiana	121,374
Hartford	Connecticut	121,054
College Station	Texas	120,511
Clovis	California	120,124
Fairfield	California	119,881
Palm Bay	Florida	119,760
Richardson	Texas	119,469
Round Rock	Texas	119,468
Cambridge	Massachusetts	118,403
Meridian	Idaho	117,635
West Palm Beach	Florida	117,415
Evansville	Indiana	117,298
Clearwater	Florida	117,292
Billings	Montana	117,116
West Jordan	Utah	116,961
Richmond	California	116,448
Westminster	Colorado	116,317
Manchester	New Hampshire	115,644
Lowell	Massachusetts	115,554
Wilmington	North Carolina	115,451
Antioch	California	115,291
Beaumont	Texas	115,282
Provo	Utah	115,162
North Charleston	South Carolina	114,852
Elgin	Illinois	114,797
Carlsbad	California	114,746
Odessa	Texas	114,428
Waterbury	Connecticut	114,403
Springfield	Illinois	114,394
League City	Texas	114,392
Downey	California	114,355
Gresham	Oregon	114,247
High Point	North Carolina	114,059
Broken Arrow	Oklahoma	113,540
Peoria	Illinois	113,150
Lansing	Michigan	112,644
Lakeland	Florida	112,641
Pompano Beach	Florida	112,046
Costa Mesa	California	111,918
Pueblo	Colorado	111,876
Lewisville	Texas	111,822
Miami Gardens	Florida	111,640
Las Cruces	New Mexico	111,385
Sugar Land	Texas	111,026
Murrieta	California	110,949
Ventura	California	110,763
Everett	Washington	110,629
Temecula	California	110,003
Dearborn	Michigan	109,976
Santa Maria	California	109,707
West Covina	California	109,501
El Monte	California	109,450
Greeley	Colorado	108,795
Sparks	Nevada	108,445
Centennial	Colorado	108,418
Boulder	Colorado	108,250
Sandy Springs	Georgia	108,080
Inglewood	California	107,762
Edison	New Jersey	107,588
South Fulton	Georgia	107,436
Green Bay	Wisconsin	107,395
Burbank	California	107,337
Renton	Washington	106,785
Hillsboro	Oregon	106,447
El Cajon	California	106,215
Tyler	Texas	105,995
Davie	Florida	105,691
San Mateo	California	105,661
Brockton	Massachusetts	105,643
Concord	North Carolina	105,240
Jurupa Valley	California	105,053
Daly City	California	104,901
Allen	Texas	104,627
Rio Rancho	New Mexico	104,046
Rialto	California	104,026
Woodbridge	New Jersey	103,639
South Bend	Indiana	103,453
Spokane Valley	Washington	102,976
Norwalk	California	102,773
Menifee	California	102,527
Vacaville	California	102,386
Wichita Falls	Texas	102,316
Davenport	Iowa	101,724
Quincy	Massachusetts	101,636
Chico	California	101,475
Lynn	Massachusetts	101,253
Lee's Summit	Missouri	101,108
New Bedford	Massachusetts	101,079
Federal Way	Washington	101,030
Clinton	Michigan	100,513
Edinburg	Texas	100,243
Nampa	Idaho	100,200
Kenosha	Wisconsin	100,045
Roanoke	Virginia	100,011

== Uruguay ==
Name	Department	Population
Montevideo	Montevideo	1,304,687
Salto	Salto	104,011

== Uzbekistan ==
City	Region	Population
Andijan	Andijan	338,366
Angren	Tashkent	128,757
Bukhara	Bukhara	237,361
Chirchiq	Tashkent	141,742
Fergana	Fergana	183,037
Jizzakh	Jizzakh	131,512
Kokand	Fergana	197,450
Margilan	Fergana	149,646
Namangan	Namangan	391,297
Navoiy	Navoiy	138,082
Nukus	Karakalpakstan	212,012
Olmaliq	Tashkent	113,114
Qarshi	Qashqadaryo	204,690
Samarkand	Samarqand	361,339
Tashkent	Tashkent	2,137,218
Termez	Surxondaryo	116,467
Urgench	Khorezm	138,609
Xoʻjayli	Karakalpakstan	104,589

== Venezuela ==
City	State	Population
Acarigua	Portuguesa	203,358
Anaco	Anzoátegui	106,000
Araure	Portuguesa	111,908
Barcelona	Anzoátegui	620,555
Barinas	Barinas	353,442
Barquisimeto	Lara	930,000
Baruta	Miranda	362,371
Cabimas	Zulia	288,595
Caracas	Capital District	2,245,744
Carora	Lara	250,000
Carúpano	Sucre	173,877
Ciudad Bolívar	Bolívar	402,476
Ciudad Guayana	Bolívar	950,000
Ciudad Ojeda	Zulia	128,941
Coro	Falcón	258,000
Cúa	Miranda	127,900
Cumaná	Sucre	423,546
El Limón	Aragua	106,206
El Tigre	Anzoátegui	236,566
El Vigia	Mérida	250,257
Guacara	Carabobo	178,000
Guanare	Portuguesa	235,201
Guarenas	Mérida	200,417
Guatire	Miranda	200,417
La Victoria	Aragua	143,468
Los Teques	Miranda	251,200
Maracaibo	Zulia	1,200,000
Maracay	Aragua	955,362
Maturín	Monagas	647,459
Mérida	Mérida	199,878
Naguanagua	Carabobo	157,437
Ocumare del Tuy	Miranda	166,112
Petare	Miranda	369,000
Porlamar	Nueva Esparta	144,830
Puerto Cabello	Carabobo	201,511
Puerto la Cruz	Anzoátegui	454,312
Punto Fijo	Falcón	277,017
San Cristóbal	Táchira	645,925
San Diego	Carabobo	187,215
San Felipe	Yaracuy	220,786
San Fernando de Apure	Apure	165,135
Santa Teresa del Tuy	Miranda	260,899
Táriba	Táchira	128,590
Tocuyito	Carabobo	173,450
Valencia	Carabobo	832,409
Valera	Trujillo	135,215

== Vietnam ==
Name	Province	Population
Bà Rịa	Bà Rịa–Vũng Tàu	205,192
Bac Giang	Bắc Giang	201,595
Bạc Liêu	Bạc Liêu	240,045
Bắc Ninh	Bắc Ninh	223,616
Bảo Lộc	Lâm Đồng	170,920
Bến Tre	Bến Tre	124,449
Biên Hòa	Đồng Nai	1,250,800
Buôn Ma Thuột	Đắk Lắk	502,170
Cà Mau	Cà Mau	315,270
Cẩm Phả	Quảng Ninh	203,435
Cam Ranh	Khánh Hòa	121,050
Cần Thơ	Cần Thơ	1,250,792
Cao Lãnh	Đồng Tháp	211,912
Châu Đốc	An Giang	161,547
Chí Linh	Hải Dương	220,421
Đà Nẵng	Đà Nẵng	1,374,562
Đà Lạt	Lâm Đồng	233,068
Đồng Hới	Quảng Bình	169,000
Đồng Xoài	Bình Phước	150,052
Hải Phòng	Hải Phòng	2,358,741
Hạ Long	Quảng Ninh	300,267
Hải Dương	Hải Dương	507,469
Hà Nội	Hà Nội	8,330,800
Hồ Chí Minh	Hồ Chí Minh	8,993,082
Huế	Thừa Thiên Huế	652,572
Hưng Yên	Hưng Yên	147,275
Kon Tum	Kon Tum	172,712
Long Khánh	Đồng Nai	245,040
Long Xuyên	An Giang	382,140
Mỹ Tho	Tiền Giang	270,700
Nam Định	Nam Định	412,350
Nha Trang	Khánh Hòa	535,000
Ninh Bình	Ninh Bình	160,166
Phan Rang–Tháp Chàm	Ninh Thuận	166,871
Phan Thiết	Bình Thuận	335,212
Phủ Lý	Hà Nam	136,654
Pleiku	Gia Lai	458,742
Quảng Ngãi	Quảng Ngãi	302,440
Quy Nhơn	Bình Định	457,400
Rạch Giá	Kiên Giang	403,120
Sa Đéc	Đồng Tháp	214,610
Sầm Sơn	Thanh Hóa	172,350
Sóc Trăng	Sóc Trăng	221,430
Sơn La	Sơn La	106,052
Sông Công	Thái Nguyên	109,409
Tam Điệp	Ninh Bình	104,175
Tam Kỳ	Quảng Nam	165,240
Tân An	Long An	215,250
Tây Ninh	Tây Ninh	153,537
Thái Bình	Thái Bình	268,167
Thái Nguyên	Thái Nguyên	420,000
Thanh Hóa	Thanh Hóa	614,500
Thủ Dầu Một	Bình Dương	417,000
Trà Vinh	Trà Vinh	160,310
Tuy Hòa	Phú Yên	202,030
Tuyên Quang	Tuyên Quang	104,645
Uông Bí	Quảng Ninh	174,678
Việt Trì	Phú Thọ	415,280
Vinh	Nghệ An	502,140
Vĩnh Long	Vĩnh Long	200,120
Vĩnh Yên	Vĩnh Phúc	152,801
Vũng Tàu	Bà Rịa–Vũng Tàu	357,124

== Yemen ==
City	Governate	Population (2005 estimate)
Aden	Aden	507,355
Al Hudaydah	Al Hudaydah	548,433
Dhamar	Dhamar	160,114
Ibb	Ibb	225,611
Mukalla	Hadhramaut	144,137
Sanaa	Sana'a	2,431,649
Seiyun	Hadhramaut	120,137
Taiz	Taiz	596,672

== Zambia ==
City	Province	Population
Chingola	Copperbelt	216,626
Chipata	Eastern	455,783
Kabwe	Central	202,360
Kasama	Northern	231,824
Kitwe	Copperbelt	517,543
Livingstone	Southern	139,509
Luanshya	Copperbelt	156,059
Lusaka	Lusaka	1,747,152
Mufulira	Copperbelt	162,889
Ndola	Copperbelt	451,246

== Zimbabwe ==
City	Region	Population (2022)
Harare	Harare	1,491,754
Bulawayo	Bulawayo	665,952
Chitungwiza	Harare	371,246
Mutare	Manicaland	224,804
Epworth	Harare	206,368
Gweru	Midlands	159,050
Kwekwe	Midlands	119,863
Kadoma	Mashonaland West	117,381

== See also ==
- World largest cities
