= List of towns and cities with 100,000 or more inhabitants/country: L-M-N-O =

This is a list of towns and cities in the world believed to have 100,000 or more inhabitants, sorted by countries beginning with letters between L and O. Unless otherwise noted, populations are based on United Nations estimates from 2022.

Index

A-B • C-D-E-F • G-H-I-J-K • L-M-N-O • P-Q-R-S • T-U-V-W-Y-Z
Back to main page

== Laos ==
City	Province / Prefecture	Population (2015)
Champhone	Savannakhet	109,200
Kaysone Phomvihane	Savannakhet	125,600
Salavan	Salavan	100,900
Songkhone	Savannakhet	100,000
Vientiane	Vientiane	820,900

== Latvia ==
City	State city	Population (2021)
Riga	Riga	620,974

== Lebanon ==
City	Governorate	Population (2014)
Beirut	Beirut	466,779
Tripoli	North	169,034

== Lesotho ==
City	District	Population (2016)
Maseru	Maseru	343,541

== Liberia ==
City	County	Population (2008)
Monrovia	Montserrado	1,021,762

== Libya ==
City	District	Population (2024)
Tripoli	Tripoli	1,150,989
Benghazi	Benghazi	650,629
Misrata	Misrata	386,120
Sabha	Sabha	256,386
Tarhuna	Murqub	210,697
Al Khums	Murqub	201,943
Zawiya	Zawiya	186,123
Ajdabiya	Al Wahat	134,358
Ajaylat	Nuqat al Khams	130,546
Sirte	Sirte	128,123
Tobruk	Butnan	121,052
Zliten	Murqub	109,972
Sabratha	Zawiya	102,038

== Lithuania ==
City	County	Population (2024)
Vilnius	Vilnius	592,156
Kaunas	Kaunas	304,210
Klaipėda	Klaipėda	159,403
Šiauliai	Šiauliai	110,463

== Luxembourg ==
City	Canton	Population (2024)
Luxembourg	Luxembourg	134,697

== Madagascar ==
City	Region	Population (2018)
Antananarivo	Analamanga	1,274,200
Toamasina	Atsinanana	325,900
Antsirabe	Vakinankaratra	246,400
Mahajanga	Boeny	246,000
Fianarantsoa	Haute Matsiatra	191,800
Toliara	Atsimo-Andrefana	168,800
Antsiranana	Diana	129,300

== Malawi ==
City	Region	Population (2016)
Blantyre	Southern	920,200
Lilongwe	Central	1,098,200
Mzuzu	Northern	239,000
Zomba	Southern	147,100

== Malaysia ==
City	State	Population (2020)
Alor Gajah	Melaka	219,210
Alor Setar	Kedah	423,868
Ampang Jaya	Selangor	531,904
Bachok	Kelantan	157,291
Baling	Kedah	142,530
Batu Pahat	Johor	401,210
Bentong	Pahang	116,799
Besut	Terengganu	154,168
Bintulu	Sarawak	240,172
Dungun	Terengganu	158,128
George Town	Penang	794,313
Ipoh	Perak	759,952
Iskandar Puteri	Johor	575,977
Jasin	Melaka	136,457
Johor Bahru	Johor	858,118
Kajang	Selangor	1,047,356
Kangar	Perlis	284,853
Kemaman	Terengganu	215,582
Keningau	Sabah	150,927
Kerian	Perak	166,352
Kinabatangan	Sabah	143,112
Klang	Selangor	902,025
Kluang	Johor	235,715
Kota Bharu Bandaraya Islam	Kelantan	396,193
Kota Kinabalu	Sabah	500,425
Kuala Kangsar	Perak	125,999
Kuala Langat	Selangor	307,418
Kuala Lumpur	Kuala Lumpur	1,982,112
Kuala Selangor	Selangor	281,717
Kuala Terengganu	Terengganu	375,424
Kuantan	Pahang	548,014
Kubang Pasu	Kedah	237,759
Kuching Selatan	Sarawak	174,625
Kuching Utara	Sarawak	174,522
Kulai	Johor	294,156
Kulim	Kedah	319,056
Lahad Datu	Sabah	229,138
Manjung	Perak	246,978
Maran	Pahang	112,330
Melaka Bandraya Bersejarah	Melaka	453,904
Miri	Sarawak	248,877
Muar	Johor	314,776
Nilai	Negeri Sembilan	201,000
Padawan	Sarawak	260,058
Papar	Sabah	150,667
Pasir Gudang	Johor	312,437
Pasir Mas	Kelantan	230,424
Pasir Puteh	Kelantan	136,157
Pekan	Pahang	121,158
Penampang	Sabah	162,174
Petaling Jaya	Selangor	771,687
Pontian	Johor	173,318
Port Dickson	Negeri Sembilan	113,738
Samarahan	Sarawak	161,890
Sandakan	Sabah	439,050
Seberang Perai	Pulau Pinang	946,092
Segamat	Johor	152,458
Selayang	Selangor	764,327
Semporna	Sabah	166,587
Sepang	Selangor	324,585
Seremban	Negeri Sembilan	681,541
Shah Alam	Selangor	812,327
Sibu	Sarawak	170,404
Subang Jaya	Selangor	902,086
Sungai Petani	Kedah	545,053
Taiping	Perak	241,517
Tanah Merah	Kelantan	150,766
Tangkak	Johor	163,449
Tawau	Sabah	420,806
Teluk Intan	Perak	172,505
Temerloh	Pahang	169,023
Tuaran	Sabah	135,665
Tumpat	Kelantan	179,944
Ulu Selangor	Selangor	241,932

== Maldives ==
City	Atoll	Population (2022)
Malé	Kaafu	137,238

== Mali ==
City	Region	Population (2009)
Bamako	Bamako	1,810,400
Kayes	Kayes	149,100
Koutiala	Sikasso	141,400
Mopti	Mopti	120,800
Ségou	Ségou	133,500

== Mauritania ==
City	Region/Capital District	Population (2023)
Nouakchott	Nouakchott	1,446,761
Nouadhibou	Dakhlet Nouadhibou	173,525

== Mauritius ==
City	District	Population (2022)
Port Louis	Port Louis	140,403
Vacoas-Phoenix	Plaines Wilhems	107,433

== Mexico ==
City	State	Population (2020)
Acapulco	Guerrero	658,600
Aguascalientes	Aguascalientes	863,900
Apatzingán	Michoacán	102,400
Apodaca	Nuevo León	536,400
Buenavista	Estado de México	216,800
Cabo San Lucas	Baja California Sur	202,700
Campeche	Campeche	249,600
Cancún	Quintana Roo	888,800
Celaya	Guanajuato	378,100
Chalco de Díaz Covarrubias	Estado de México	174,700
Chetumal	Quintana Roo	169,000
Chicoloapan de Juárez	Estado de México	193,500
Chihuahua	Chihuahua	925,800
Chilpancingo	Guerrero	225,700
Chimalhuacán	Estado de México	703,200
Cholula de Rivadabia	Puebla	102,300
Ciudad Acuña	Coahuila	160,200
Ciudad Benito Juárez	Nuevo León	308,300
Ciudad Cuauhtémoc	Chihuahua	135,600
Ciudad de México	Ciudad de México	9,209,900
Ciudad del Carmen	Campeche	191,200
Ciudad Guzmán	Jalisco	112,000
Ciudad Juárez	Chihuahua	1,501,600
Ciudad López Mateos	Estado de México	523,100
Ciudad Madero	Tamaulipas	205,900
Ciudad Nezahualcóyotl	Estado de México	1,072,700
Ciudad Nicolás Romero	Estado de México	323,500
Ciudad Obregón	Sonora	329,400
Ciudad Valles	San Luis Potosí	136,400
Ciudad Victoria	Tamaulipas	332,100
Coatzacoalcos	Veracruz	212,500
Colima	Colima	147,000
Comitán	Chiapas	113,500
Córdoba	Veracruz	139,100
Cuautitlán	Estado de México	118,000
Cuautitlán Izcalli	Estado de México	515,400
Cuautla	Morelos	157,300
Cuernavaca	Morelos	341,000
Culiacán	Sinaloa	808,400
Delicias	Chihuahua	128,600
Durango	Durango	616,100
Ecatepec	Estado de México	1,643,600
Ensenada	Baja California	330,700
Fresnillo	Zacatecas	143,300
García	Nuevo León	234,700
General Escobedo	Nuevo León	455,000
Gómez Palacio	Durango	301,700
Guadalajara	Jalisco	1,385,600
Guadalupe	Nuevo León	635,900
Guadalupe	Zacatecas	170,000
Guaymas	Sonora	117,300
Hermosillo	Sonora	855,600
Iguala	Guerrero	132,900
Irapuato	Guanajuato	452,100
Ixtapaluca	Estado de México	368,600
Jiutepec	Morelos	174,600
Kanasín	Yucatán	139,800
Lagos de Moreno	Jalisco	111,600
La Paz	Baja California Sur	250,100
León	Guanajuato	1,579,800
Los Mochis	Sinaloa	298,000
Manzanillo	Colima	159,900
Matamoros	Tamaulipas	510,700
Mazatlán	Sinaloa	442,000
Mérida	Yucatán	921,800
Mexicali	Baja California	854,200
Minatitlán	Veracruz	101,300
Miramar	Tamaulipas	161,800
Monclova	Coahuila	237,200
Monterrey	Nuevo León	1,143,000
Morelia	Michoacán	743,300
Naucalpan	Estado de México	776,200
Naucalpan (Huixquilucan)	Estado de México	135,000
Navojoa	Sonora	120,900
Nogales	Sonora	261,100
Nuevo Laredo	Tamaulipas	416,100
Oaxaca	Oaxaca	258,900
Ojo de Agua	Estado de México	386,300
Orizaba	Veracruz	120,500
Pachuca	Hidalgo	297,800
Parral	Chihuahua	113,800
Piedras Negras	Coahuila	174,000
Playa del Carmen	Quintana Roo	304,900
Poza Rica	Veracruz	180,100
Puebla	Puebla	1,542,200
Puerto Vallarta	Jalisco	224,200
Querétaro	Querétaro	794,800
Ramos Arizpe	Coahuila	114,000
Reynosa	Tamaulipas	691,600
Río Bravo	Tamaulipas	111,300
Rosarito	Baja California	100,700
Salamanca	Guanajuato	160,700
Saltillo	Coahuila	864,400
San Cristóbal de las Casas	Chiapas	183,500
San Francisco Coacalco	Estado de México	293,200
San Juan Bautista	Oaxaca	103,600
San Juan del Río	Querétaro	177,700
San José del Cabo	Baja California Sur	136,300
San Luis Potosí	San Luis Potosí	845,900
San Luis Río Colorado	Sonora	176,700
San Nicolás de los Garza	Nuevo León	412,200
San Pablo de las Salinas	Estado de México	158,000
San Pedro Garza García	Nuevo León	132,100
Santa Catarina	Nuevo León	304,100
Soledad de Graciano Sánchez	San Luis Potosí	310,200
Tampico	Tamaulipas	297,400
Tapachula	Chiapas	217,600
Tehuacán	Puebla	293,800
Temixco	Morelos	104,500
Tepexpan	Estado de México	120,800
Tepic	Nayarit	371,400
Tijuana	Baja California	1,810,600
Tlalnepantla	Estado de México	658,900
Tlaquepaque	Jalisco	650,100
Toluca	Estado de México	223,900
Tonalá	Jalisco	442,400
Torreón	Coahuila	690,200
Tulancingo	Hidalgo	106,200
Tuxtla Gutiérrez	Chiapas	578,800
Uruapan	Michoacán	299,500
Veracruz	Veracruz	406,000
Veracruz (Boca del Río)	Veracruz	132,000
Villa de Álvarez	Colima	147,500
Villahermosa	Tabasco	340,100
Xalapa-Enríquez	Veracruz	443,100
Xico	Estado de México	384,300
Zacatecas	Zacatecas	138,400
Zamora de Hidalgo	Michoacán	154,500
Zapopan	Jalisco	1,257,500

== Moldova ==
City	Municipality	Population (2014)
Chișinău	Chișinău	532,513
Tiraspol	Transnistria	133,807

== Mongolia ==
City	Province	Population (2021)
Ulaanbaatar	Ulaanbaatar	1,466,431
Erdenet	Orkhon	102,141

== Montenegro ==
City	Municipality	Population (2023)
Podgorica	Podgorica	173,024

== Morocco ==
City	Region	Population (2014)
Agadir	Souss-Massa	505,800
Al Hoceima	Tangier-Tetouan-Al Hoceima	137,000
Béni-Mellal	Béni Mellal-Khénifra	325,400
Berkane	Oriental	182,200
Berrechid	Casablanca-Settat	482,100
Casablanca	Casablanca-Settat	3,352,400
El Kelâa des Sraghna	Marrakesh-Safi	152,900
El-Jadida	Casablanca-Settat	311,000
Errachidia	Drâa-Tafilalet	193,700
Essaouira	Marrakesh-Safi	106,300
Fès	Fès-Meknès	1,126,600
Fquih Ben Salah	Béni Mellal-Khénifra	204,700
Guelmim	Guelmim-Oued Noun	138,800
Kénitra	Rabat-Salé-Kénitra	604,200
Khemisset	Rabat-Salé-Kénitra	279,900
Khénifra	Béni Mellal-Khénifra	228,500
Khouribga	Béni Mellal-Khénifra	376,800
Larache	Tanger-Tetouan-Al Hoceima	264,800
Marrakech	Marrakesh-Safi	978,000
Meknès	Fès-Meknès	685,400
Mohammedia	Casablanca-Settat	288,100
Nador	Oriental	390,900
Ouarzazate	Drâa-Tafilalet	113,200
Oujda	Oriental	504,500
Rabat	Rabat-Salé-Kénitra	578,600
Safi	Marrakesh-Safi	345,600
Salé	Rabat-Salé-Kénitra	913,000
Sefrou	Fès-Meknès	155,000
Settat	Casablanca-Settat	215,700
Sidi Kacem	Rabat-Salé-Kénitra	168,300
Sidi Slimane	Rabat-Salé-Kénitra	130,600
Skhirate-Témara	Rabat-Salé-Kénitra	512,900
Tanger	Tanger-Tetouan-Al Hoceima	999,000
Taourirt	Oriental	149,600
Taza	Fès-Meknès	207,700
Tétouan	Tanger-Tetouan-Al Hoceima	396,800
Youssoufia	Marrakesh-Safi	100,600

== Mozambique ==
City	Province	Population (2015)
Beira	Sofala	460,900
Chimoio	Manica	314,800
Lichinga	Niassa	214,600
Maputo	Maputo (city)	1,241,700
Matola	Maputo	927,100
Maxixe	Inhambane	127,400
Nacala	Nampula	241,100
Nampula	Nampula	622,400
Pemba	Cabo Delgado	199,500
Quelimane	Zambezia	241,100
Tete	Tete	213,400
Xai-Xai	Gaza	128,900

== Myanmar ==
City	Administrative division	Population (2014)
Bago	Bago	491,100
Dawei	Tanintharyi	125,200
Hpa-an	Kayin	421,400
Loikaw	Kayah	128,800
Magway	Magway	288,900
Mandalay	Mandalay	1,225,100
Mawlamyine	Mon	288,100
Monywa	Sagaing	372,000
Myitkyina	Kachin	305,300
Naypyidaw	Naypyidaw	1,158,400
Pathein	Ayeyarwady	286,700
Sittway	Rakhine	149,300
Taunggyi	Shan	380,700
Yangon	Yangon	5,209,500

== Namibia ==
City	Region	Population (2023)
Windhoek	Khomas	486,169
Rundu	Kavango East	118,625
Walvis Bay	Erongo	102,704

== Nepal ==
City	Province	Population (2011)
Bharatpur	Bagmati	147,800
Bhimdatta	Sudurpashchim	106,700
Biratnagar	Province No. 1	204,900
Birgunj	Madhesh	139,100
Butwal	Lumbini Pradesh	121,000
Dhangadhi	Sudurpashchim	104,000
Dharan	Province No. 1	119,900
Janakpur	Madhesh Province	195,438
Kathmandu	Bagmati	1,003,300
Lalitpur	Bagmati	226,700
Pokhara	Gandaki	265,000

== Netherlands ==
City	Province	Population (2023)
Alkmaar	North Holland	112,445
Almere	Flevoland	226,438
Alphen aan den Rijn	South Holland	114,970
Amersfoort	Utrecht	161,734
Amsterdam	North Holland	935,521
Apeldoorn	Gelderland	168,265
Arnhem	Gelderland	167,671
Breda	North Brabant	188,277
Delft	South Holland	109,452
Deventer	Overijssel	103,456
Dordrecht	South Holland	122,040
Ede	Gelderland	123,545
Eindhoven	North Brabant	246,581
Emmen	Drenthe	109,311
Enschede	Overijssel	161,947
Groningen	Groningen	244,003
Haarlem	North Holland	167,752
Haarlemmermeer	North Holland	163,191
The Hague	South Holland	565,817
's-Hertogenbosch	North Brabant	160,724
Leeuwarden	Friesland	128,845
Leiden	South Holland	130,269
Maastricht	Limburg	125,464
Nijmegen	Gelderland	186,798
Rotterdam	South Holland	671,221
Tilburg	North Brabant	229,940
Utrecht	Utrecht	374,409
Venlo	Limburg	103,688
Westland	South Holland	115,922
Zaanstad	North Holland	161,279
Zoetermeer	South Holland	128,325
Zwolle	Overijssel	133,065

== New Zealand ==
City	Region	Population (2018)
Auckland	Auckland	1,309,197
Christchurch	Canterbury	369,006
Wellington	Wellington	202,737
Hamilton	Waikato	160,911
Tauranga	Bay of Plenty	136,713
Dunedin	Otago	126,255
Lower Hutt	Wellington	104,532

== Nicaragua ==
City	Department	Population (2009)
Chinandega	Chinandega	106,600
León	León	156,000
Managua	Managua	985,100
Masaya	Masaya	110,500
Tipitapa	Managua	105,800

== Niger ==
City	Region	Population (2012)
Agadez	Agadez	110,500
Maradi	Maradi	267,200
Niamey	Niamey Urban Community	978,000
Tahoua	Tahoua	117,800
Zinder	Zinder	235,600

== Nigeria ==
The following table lists fully defined incorporated cities in Nigeria, with a population of at least 100,000, as declared by the Nigerian National Population Commission in the 2006 National census.

City	State	Population (2006)
Aba	Abia	534,300
Abakaliki	Ebonyi	151,700
Abeokuta	Ogun	451,600
Abuja	FCT	776,300
Ado Ekiti	Ekiti	308,600
Akure	Ondo	484,800
Asaba	Delta	149,600
Awka	Anambra	301,700
Badagry	Lagos	241,100
Bama	Borno	102,800
Bauchi	Bauchi	493,800
Benin City	Edo	1,147,200
Bida	Niger	188,200
Buguma	Rivers	124,200
Calabar	Cross River	371,000
Enugu	Enugu	722,700
Epe	Lagos	181,400
Funtua	Katsina	122,500
Garki	Jigawa	152,200
Gashua	Yobe	109,600
Gboko	Benue	166,400
Gbongan	Osun	117,300
Gombe	Gombe	230,900
Gusau	Zamfara	201,200
Ibadan	Oyo	2,559,900
Ife	Osun	509,000
Igboho	Oyo	115,000
Ijebu Ode	Ogun	186,700
Ijero	Ekiti	147,300
Ikare	Ondo	160,600
Ikeja	Lagos	313,200
Ikorodu	Lagos	535,600
Ikot Ekpene	Akwa Ibom	143,100
Ila	Osun	150,700
Ilawe Ekiti	Ekiti	160,700
Ilesa	Osun	233,900
Ilorin	Kwara	777,700
Ise Ekiti	Ekiti	167,100
Iseyin	Oyo	286,700
Iwo	Osun	191,400
Jalingo	Taraba	139,800
Jimeta	Adamawa	218,400
Jos	Plateau	821,600
Kaduna	Kaduna	760,100
Katsina	Katsina	318,500
Kano	Kano	2,828,900
Kisi	Oyo	130,800
Kukawa	Borno	203,900
Lafia	Nasarawa	330,700
Lagos	Lagos	8,048,400
Lavun	Niger	209,900
Maiduguri	Borno	543,000
Makurdi	Benue	249,000
Minna	Niger	348,800
Mokwa	Niger	244,900
Mubi	Adamawa	280,000
Nnewi	Anambra	391,200
Nsukka	Enugu	309,600
Obafemi Owode	Ogun	228,900
Ogbomosho	Oyo	299,500
Okene	Kogi	320,300
Okigwe	Imo	132,200
Okpoko	Anambra	152,900
Ondo City	Ondo	358,400
Onitsha	Anambra	261,600
Osogbo	Osun	156,700
Otukpo	Benue	136,800
Owerri	Imo	401,900
Owo	Ondo	218,900
Oyo	Oyo	428,800
Port Harcourt	Rivers	1,005,900
Potiskum	Yobe	205,900
Sagamu	Ogun	253,400
Sapele	Delta	151,000
Shaki	Oyo	150,300
Sokoto	Sokoto	427,800
Suleja	Niger	216,600
Ugep	Cross River	187,000
Umuahia	Abia	359,200
Uromi	Edo	101,400
Uyo	Akwa Ibom	427,900
Warri	Delta	557,400
Yenagoa	Bayelsa	352,300
Yola	Adamawa	392,900
Zaria	Kaduna	695,100

== North Korea ==
City	Province	Population (2008)
Anju	South Pyongan	240,100
Chongjin	North Hamyong	667,900
Chongju	North Pyongan	189,700
Haeju	South Hwanghae	273,300
Hamhung	South Hamgyong	768,600
Hoeryong	North Hamyong	153,500
Huichon	Chagang	168,200
Hyesan	Ryanggang	192,700
Kaechon	South Pyongan	319,600
Kaesong	Kaesong	308,400
Kanggye	Chagang	252,000
Kimchaek	North Hamyong	207,300
Kusong	North Pyongan	196,500
Manpo	Chagang	116,800
Munchon	Kangwon	122,900
Nampo	South Pyongan	366,300
Pyongsong	South Pyongan	284,400
Pyongyang	Pyongyang	3,255,300
Rason	Rason	197,000
Sariwon	North Hwanghae	307,800
Sinpo	South Hamgyong	152,800
Sinuiju	North Pyongan	359,300
Songrim	North Hwanghae	128,800
Sunchon	South Pyongan	297,300
Tokchon	South Pyongan	237,100
Tanchon	South Hamgyong	345,900
Wonsan	Kangwon	363,100

== North Macedonia ==
City	Region	Population (2021)
Skopje	Skopje	422,540

== Norway ==
City	County	Population (2024)
Oslo	Oslo	717,710
Bergen	Vestland	291,940
Trondheim	Trøndelag	214,565
Stavanger	Rogaland	149,048
Fredrikstad	Østfold	130,921
Kristiansand	Agder	116,986
Drammen	Buskerud	104,487

== Oman ==
City	Governorate	Population (2020)
Muscat	Muscat	617,503
Seeb	Muscat	470,878
Salalah	Dhofar	293,962
Sohar	Al Batinah North	219,264

== See also ==
- World largest cities
