= List of towns and cities with 100,000 or more inhabitants/country: A-B =

This is a list of towns and cities in the world believed to have 100,000 or more inhabitants, sorted by countries beginning with letters between A and B. Unless otherwise noted, populations are based on United Nations estimates from 2022.

Index

A-B • C-D-E-F • G-H-I-J-K • L-M-N-O • P-Q-R-S • T-U-V-W-Y-Z
Back to main page

== Afghanistan ==
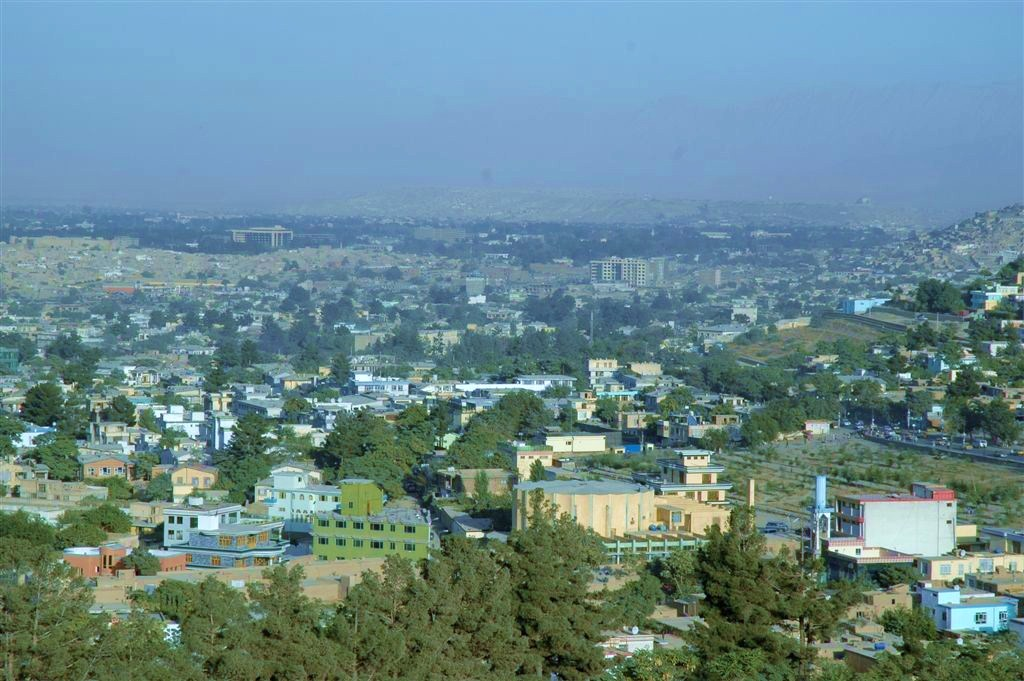
Kabul

Name	Province	Population (2015)
Ghazni	Ghazni	190,400
Herat	Herat	592,900
Jalalabad	Nangarhar	280,600
Kabul	Kabul	4,601,700
Kandahar	Kandahar	651,400
Khost	Khost	160,214
Kunduz	Kunduz	268,800
Lashkargah	Helmand	201,500
Mazar-i-Sharif	Balkh	500,200
Mihtarlam	Laghman	144,162
Puli Khumri	Baghlan	221,200
Sar-e Pol	Sar-e Pol	164,500
Sheberghan	Jowzjan	175,599
Taloqan	Takhar	196,400

== Albania ==
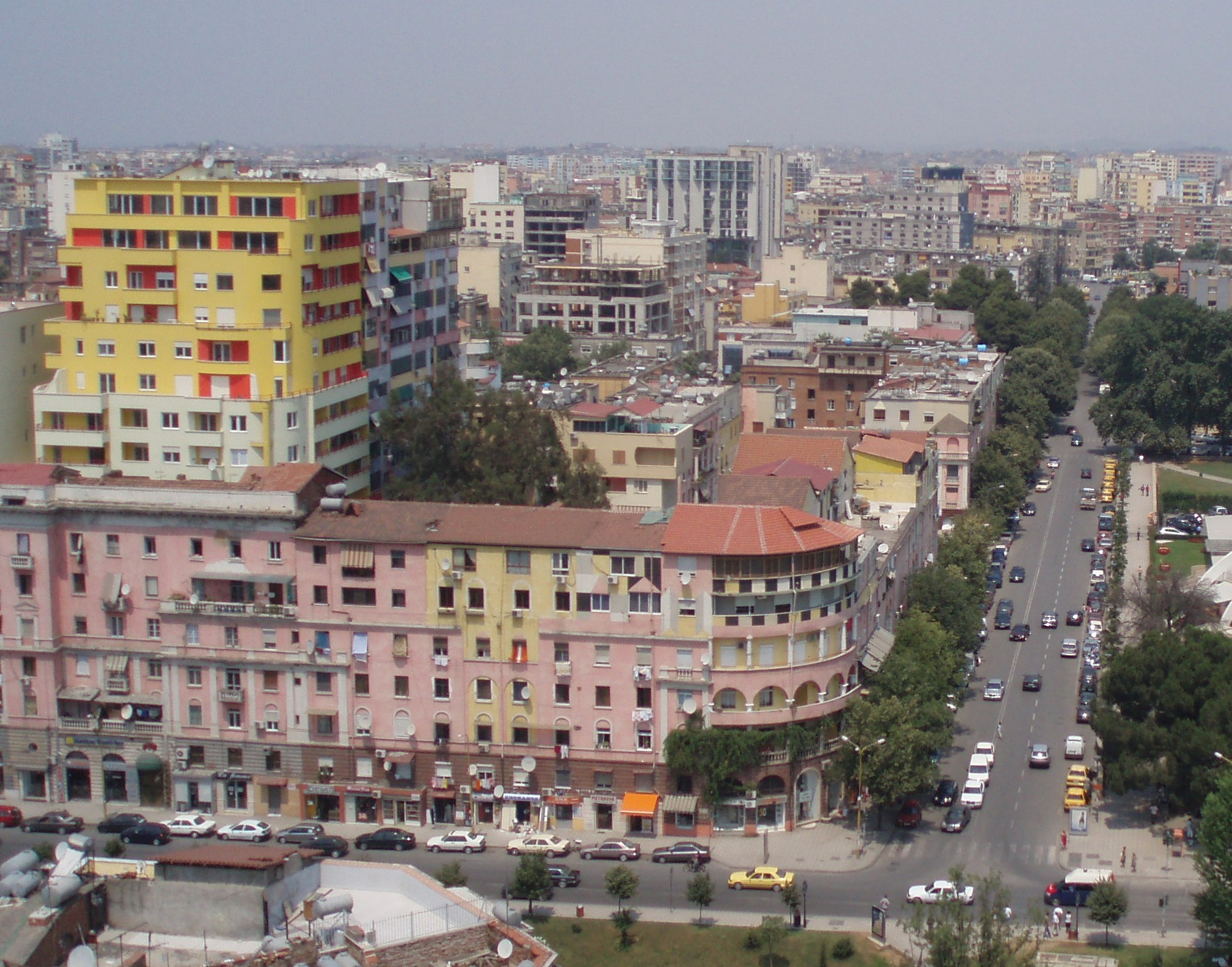
Tirana, Capital of Albania

Name	County	Population (2011)
Tirana	Tirana	800,986
Durrës	Durrës	265,330

== Algeria ==
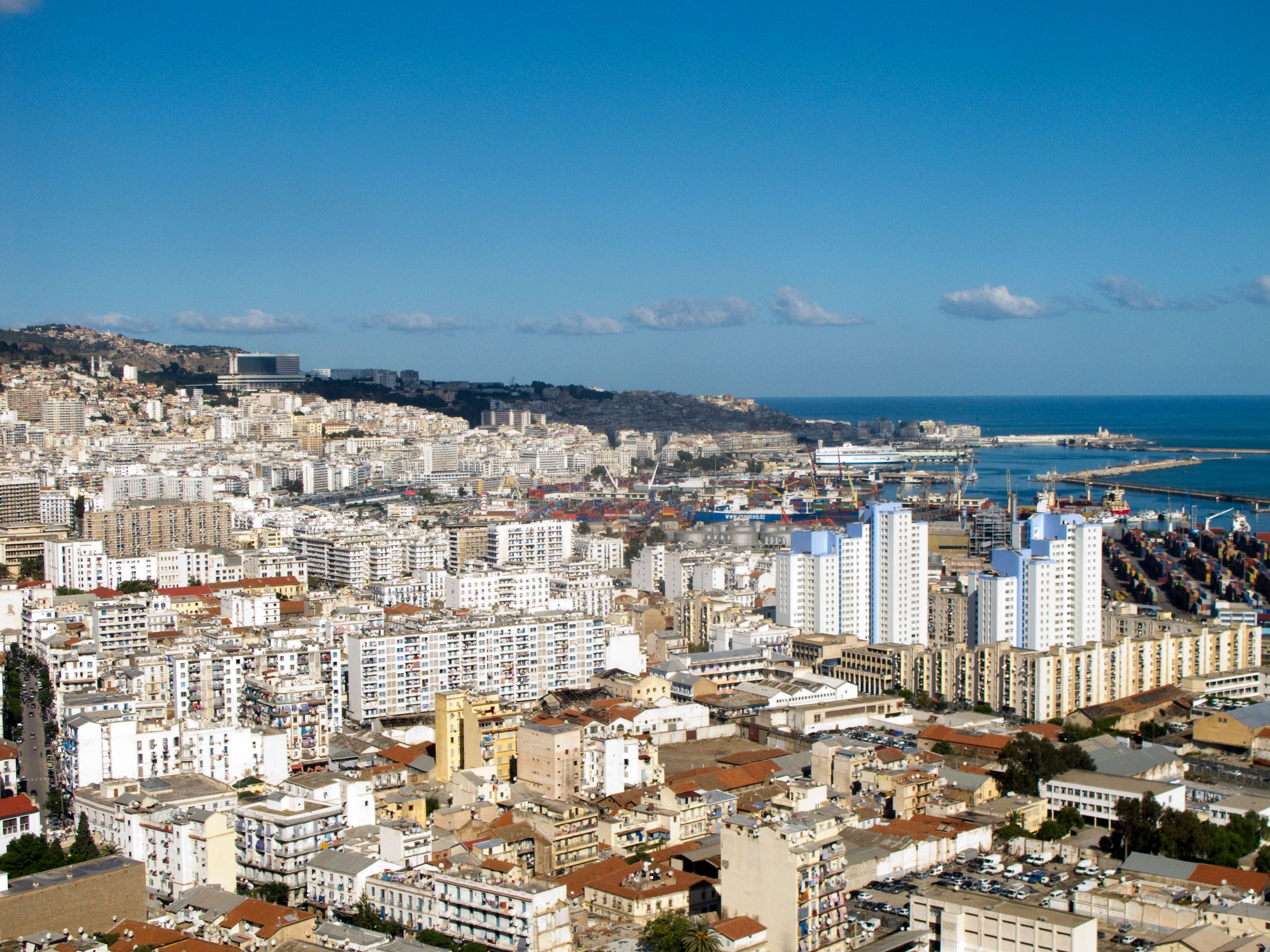
Algiers, Capital of Algeria

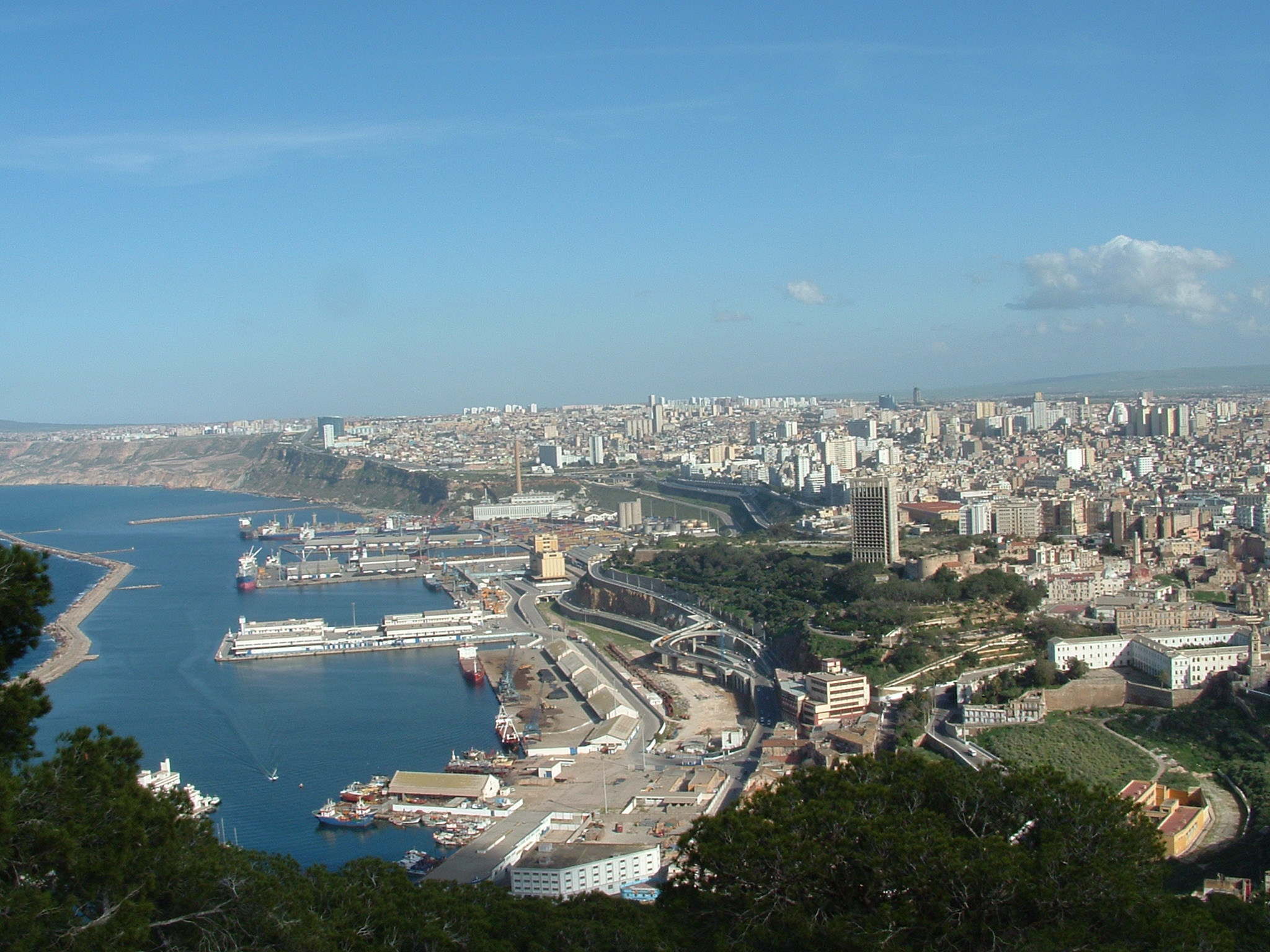
Oran

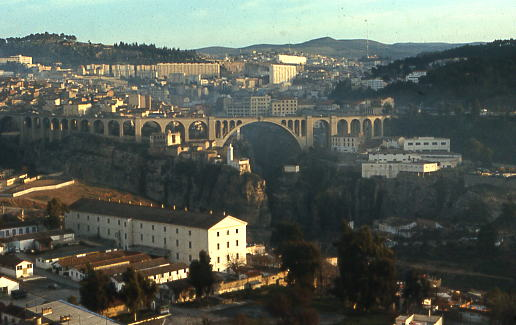
Constantine

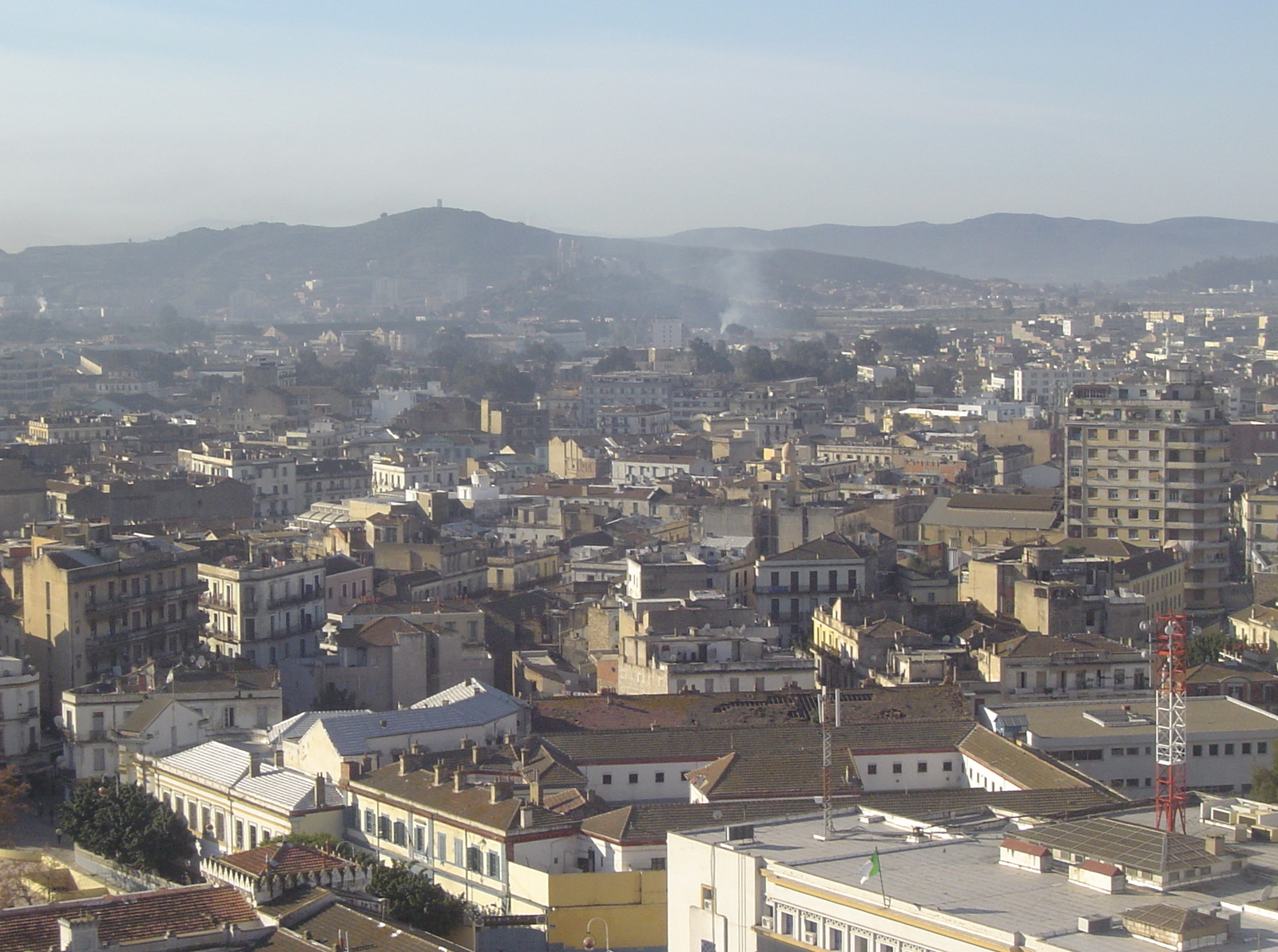
Annaba

City	Province	Population (2008)
Aflou	Laghouat	102,000
Aïn Beïda	Oum El Bouaghi	116,000
Aïn Oussera	Djelfa	134,100
Algiers	Algiers	3,915,800
Annaba	Annaba	257,300
Barika	Batna	104,300
Batna	Batna	290,600
Béchar	Béchar	165,600
Bejaïa	Béjaïa	177,900
Beskra	Biskra	307,900
Bordj Bou Arréridj	Bordj Bou Arréridj	158,800
Bou Saâda	M'Sila	111,700
Chlef	Chlef	178,600
El Boulaïda	Blida	182,400
El Djelfa	Djelfa	339,200
El Eulma	Sétif	355,000
El Oued	El Oued	134,600
Ghardaïa	Ghardaïa	142,900
Ghilizane	Relizane	123,200
Guelma	Guelma	120,000
Jijel	Jijel	131,500
Khenchela	Khenchela	114,400
Laghouat	Laghouat	134,300
Maghnia	Tlemcen	114,600
Lemdiyya	Médéa	145,400
Mestghanem	Mostaganem	245,300
Mouaskar	Mascara	108,600
M'Sila	M'Sila	132,900
Qacentina	Constantine	464,200
Saïda	Saïda	142,400
Sidi-bel-Abbès	Sidi Bel Abbès	212,900
Skikda	Skikda	182,900
Souk Ahras	Souk Ahras	156,700
Sétif	Sétif	788,400
Tébessa	Tébessa	196,500
Tiaret	Tiaret	178,900
Tlemsen	Tlemcen	377,400
Tizi Ouzou	Tizi Ouzou	142,900
Oran	Oran	803,300
Ouargla	Ouargla	133,000

== Angola ==
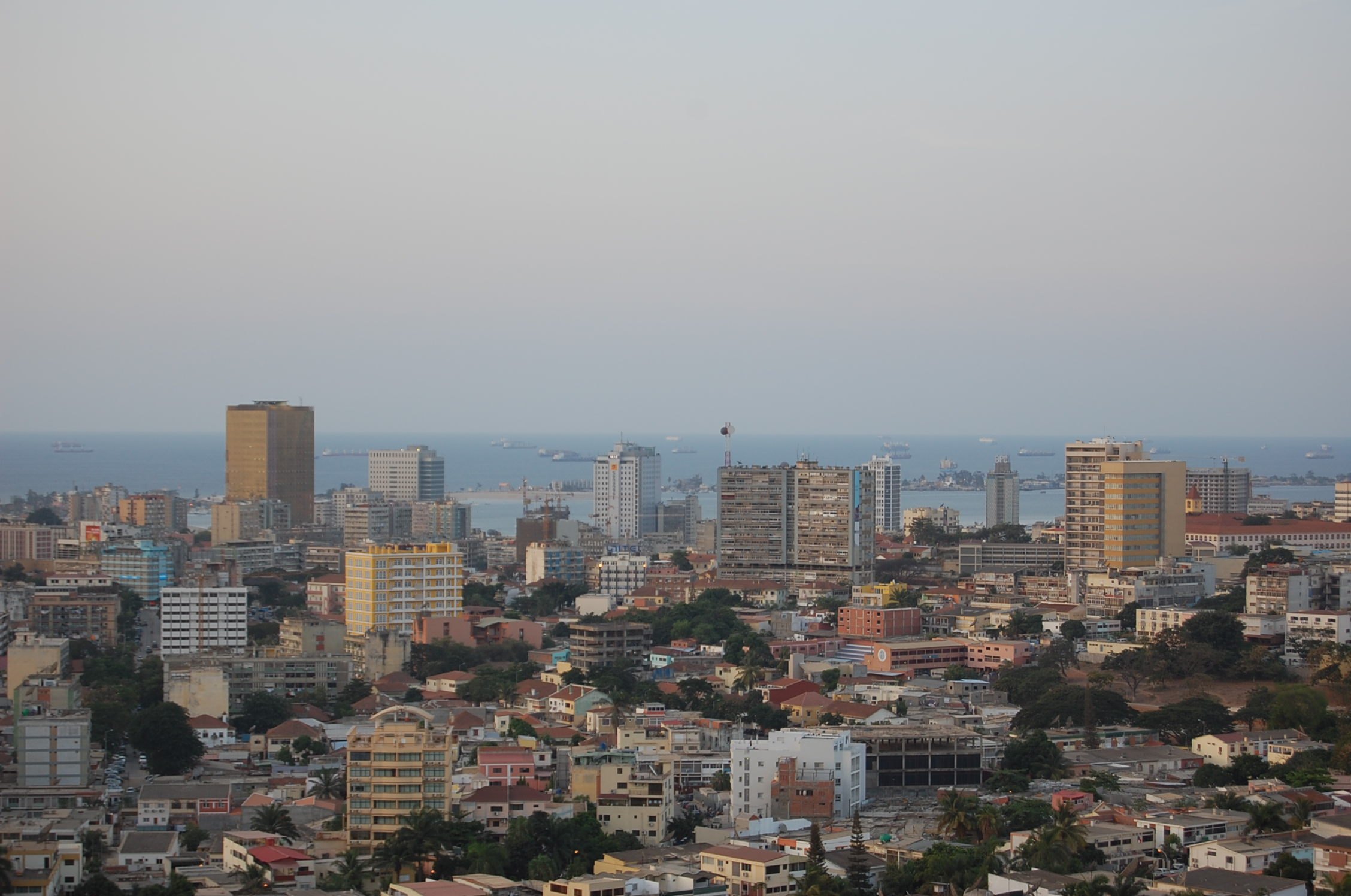
Luanda, Capital of Angola

City	Province	Population (2014)
Benguela	Benguela	561,700
Caála	Huambo	279,700
Cabinda	Cabinda	624,600
Cubal	Benguela	305,600
Dundo	Lunda Norte	177,600
Gabela	Cuanza Sul	184,700
Huambo	Huambo	713,100
Kuito	Bié	450,800
Lobito	Benguela	393,000
Luanda	Luanda	2,571,800
Lubango	Huíla	776,200
Lucapa	Lunda Norte	154,300
Luena	Moxico	357,400
Malanje	Malanje	506,800
M'banza-Kongo	Zaire	180,300
Menongue	Cuando Cubango	320,900
Moçâmedes	Namibe	292,500
Negage	Uíge	137,500
N'dalatando	Cuanza Norte	168,800
Ondjiva	Cunene	187,900
Quilamba	Luanda	129,000
Saurimo	Lunda Sul	442,400
Soyo	Zaire	266,900
Sumbe	Cuanza Sul	279,900
Uíge	Uíge	616,600

== Argentina ==
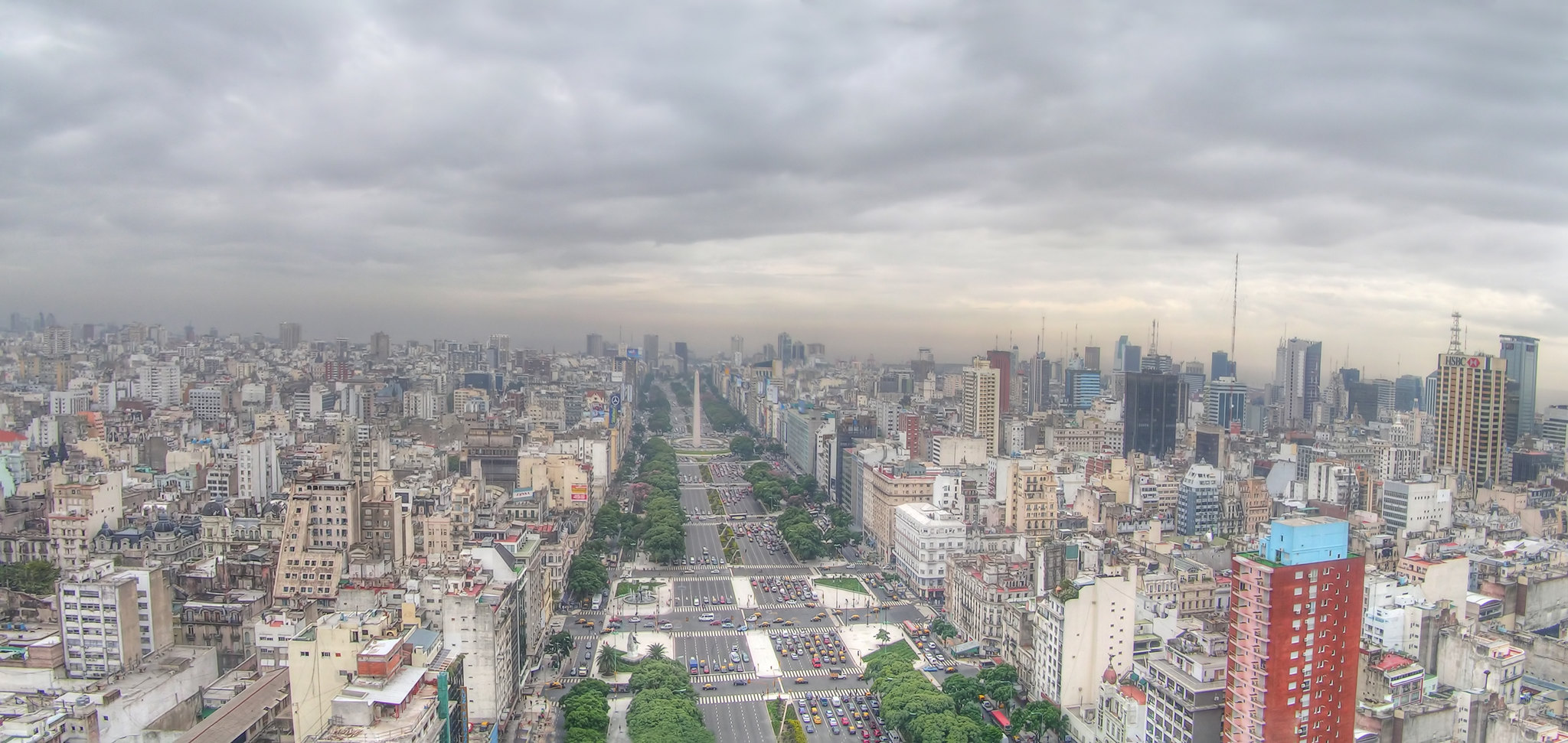
Buenos Aires, Capital of Argentina

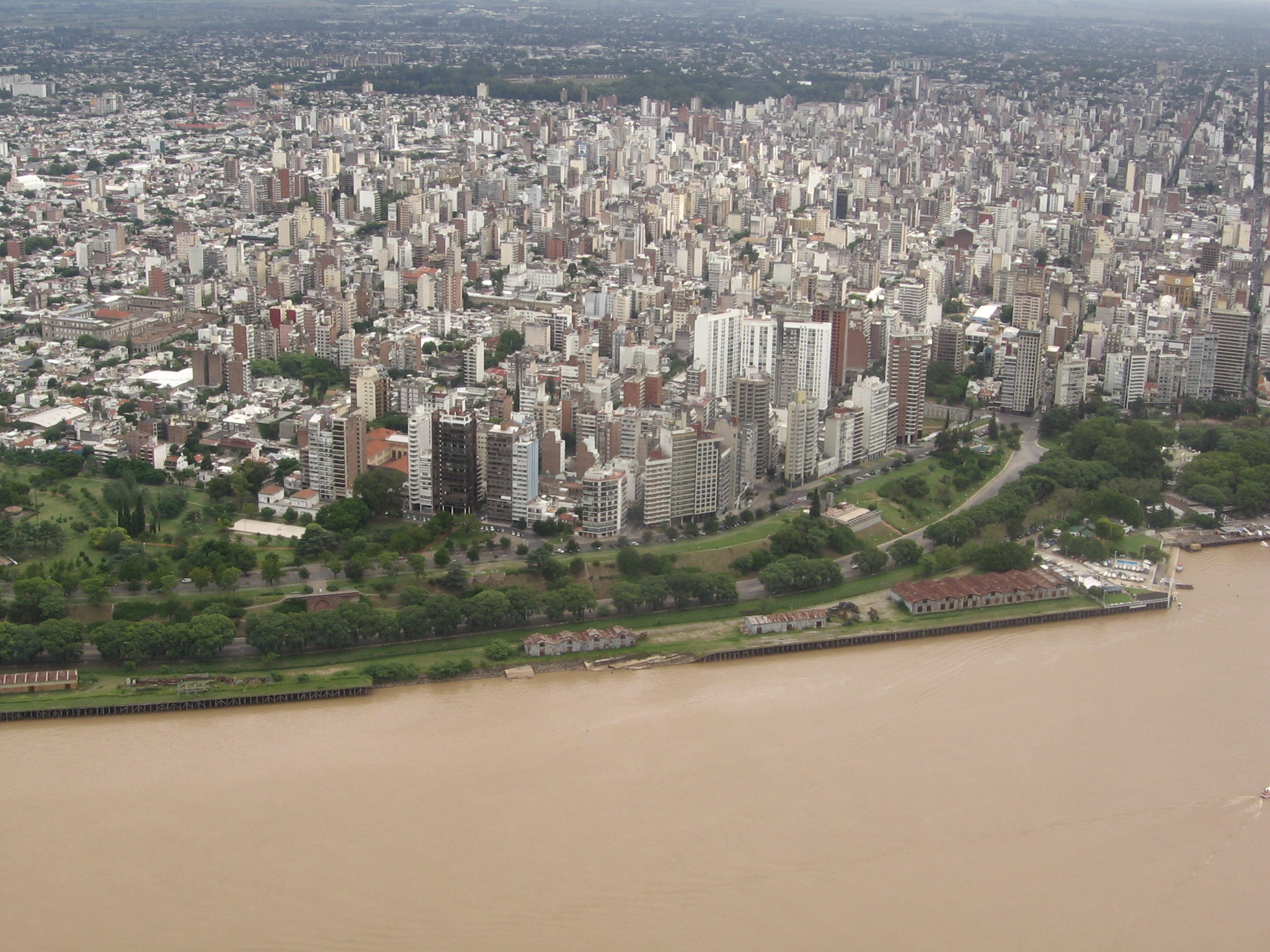
Rosario

City	Province	Population (2022)
Bahía Blanca	Buenos Aires	334,505
Bariloche	Río Negro	161,443
Berisso	Buenos Aires	100,685
Buenos Aires	City of Buenos Aires	10,801,336
Campana	Buenos Aires	107,976
Catamarca	Catamarca	186,466
Comodoro Rivadavia	Chubut	214,829
Concordia	Entre Ríos	197,603
Córdoba	Córdoba	1,498,060
Corrientes	Corrientes	437,446
Formosa	Formosa	268,572
Godoy Cruz	Mendoza	194,557
Las Heras	Mendoza	233,839
Luján de Cuyo	Mendoza	171,883
Mar del Plata	Buenos Aires	660,569
Mendoza	Mendoza	123,715
Neuquén	Neuquén	467,217
Paraná	Entre Ríos	388,716
La Plata	Buenos Aires	756,074
Posadas	Misiones	391,498
Resistencia	Chaco	413,764
Río Cuarto	Córdoba	277,979
Río Gallegos	Santa Cruz	137,309
La Rioja	La Rioja	210,507
Rosario	Santa Fe	1,337,958
Salta	Salta	624,003
San Juan	San Juan	260,769
San Luis	San Luis	221,400
San Martín	Mendoza	139,406
San Nicolás	Buenos Aires	166,657
San Rafael	Mendoza	213,204
San Salvador de Jujuy	Jujuy	319,469
Santa Fe	Santa Fe	568,259
Santa Rosa	La Pampa	118,504
Santiago del Estero	Santiago del Estero	328,824
Tucumán	Tucumán	587,289
Trelew	Chubut	144,420

== Armenia ==
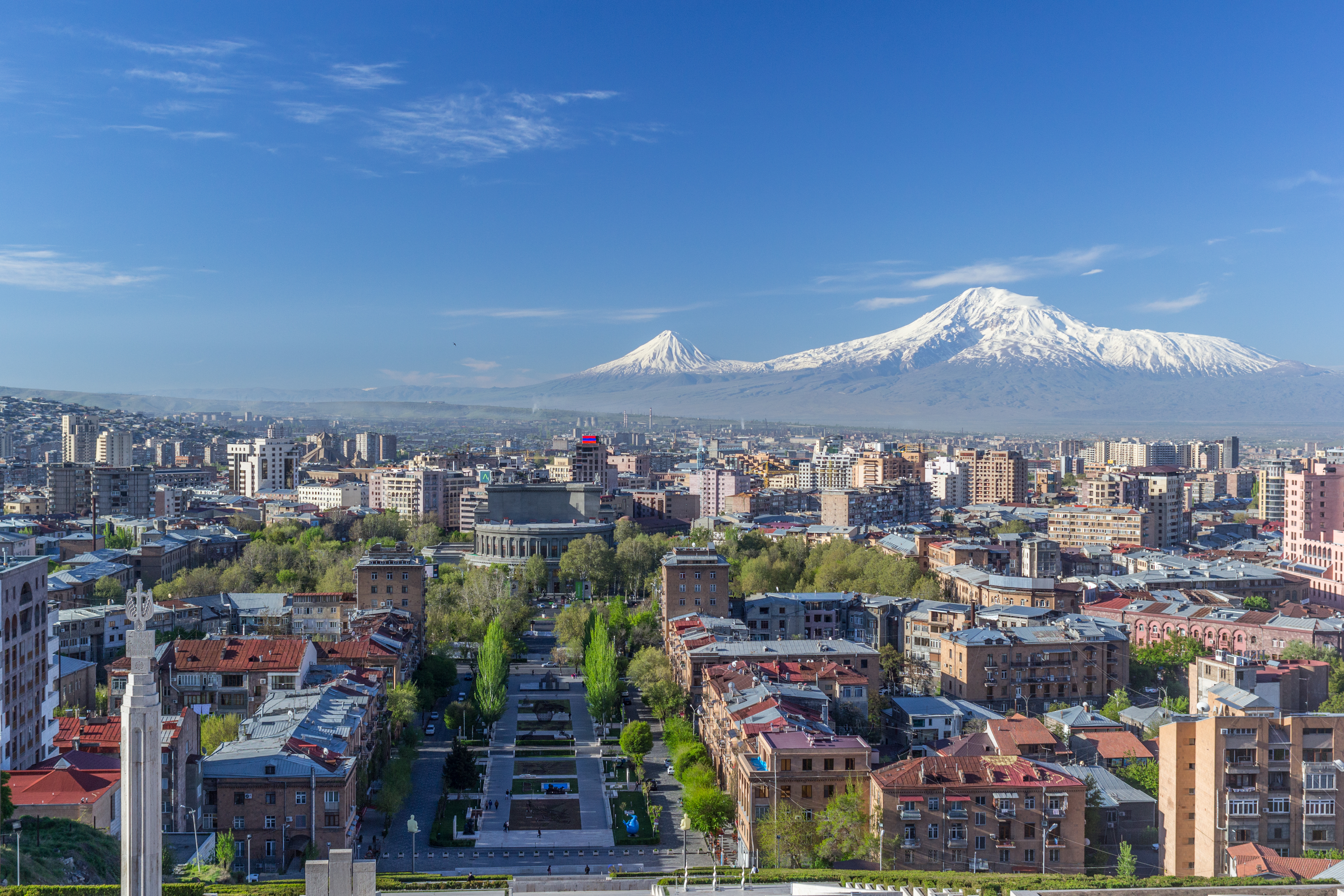
Yerevan, Capital of Armenia

City	Province	Population (2024)
Yerevan	Yerevan	1,136,300
Gyumri	Shirak	114,800

== Australia ==
City	State/Territory	Population (2021)
Sydney	New South Wales	4,698,656
Melbourne	Victoria	4,585,537
Brisbane	Queensland	2,287,896
Perth	Western Australia	2,043,762
Adelaide	South Australia	1,245,011
Gold Coast	Queensland	607,665
Canberra	Australian Capital Territory	452,670
Newcastle	New South Wales	348,539
Central Coast	New South Wales	325,255
Sunshine Coast	Queensland	284,131
Wollongong	New South Wales	280,153
Hobart	Tasmania	197,451
Geelong	Victoria	180,239
Townsville	Queensland	173,724
Cairns	Queensland	153,181
Darwin	Northern Territory	122,207
Toowoomba	Queensland	108,398
Ballarat	Victoria	105,348
Bendigo	Victoria	100,649

== Austria ==
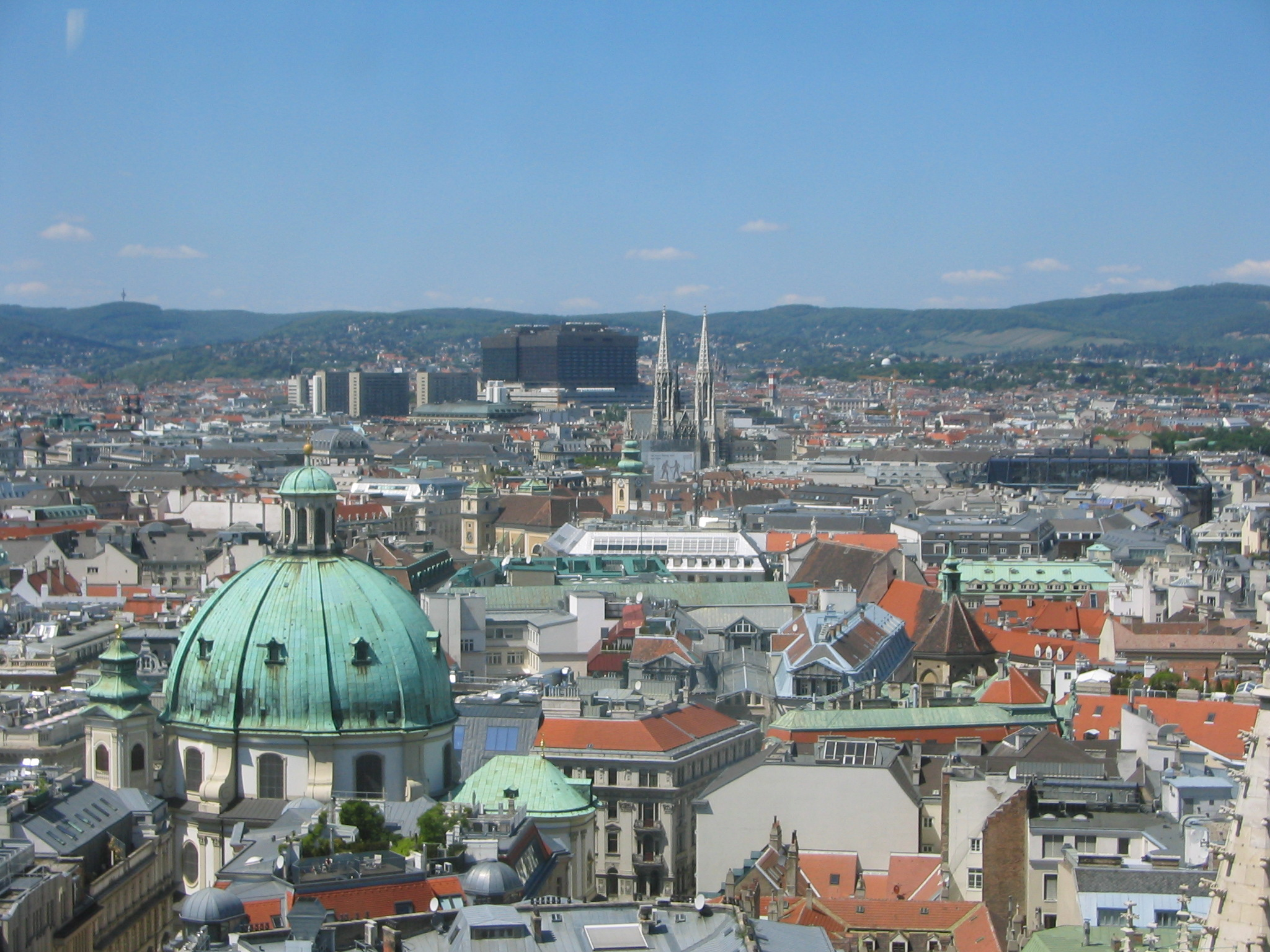
Vienna, Capital of Austria

City	State	Population (2025)
Graz	Styria	305,323
Innsbruck	Tyrol	132,471
Klagenfurt	Carinthia	105,280
Linz	Upper Austria	213,574
Salzburg	Salzburg	157,652
Vienna	Vienna	2,028,399

== Azerbaijan ==
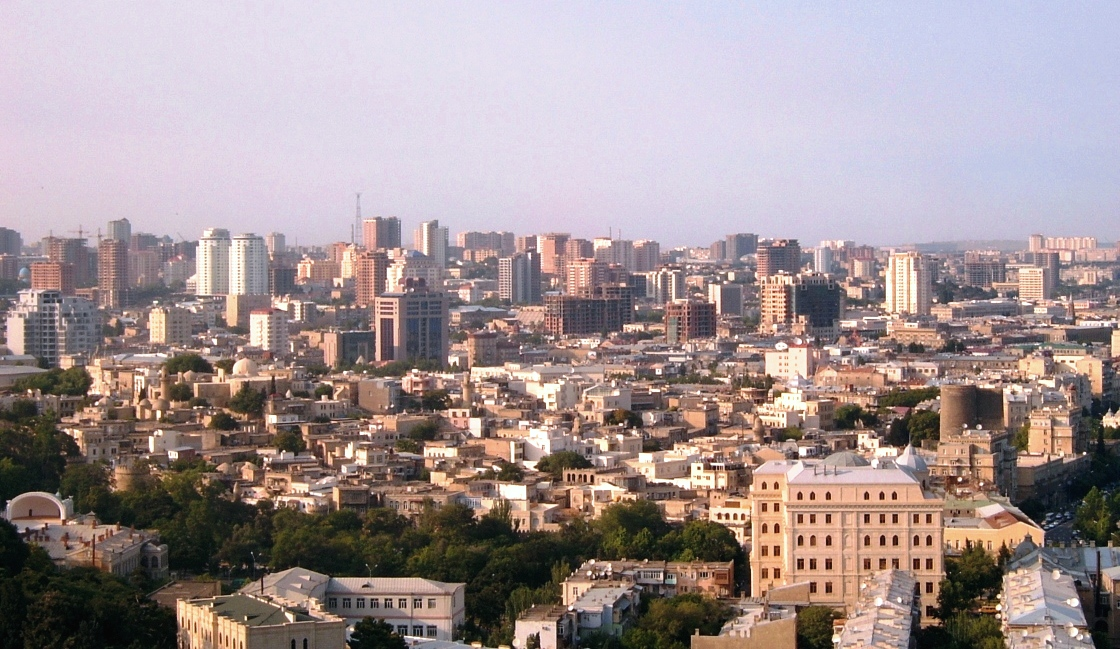
Baku, capital of Azerbaijan

City	Region	Population
Baku	Baku	2,344,900
Sumgait	Absheron-Khizi	427,000
Ganja	Ganja-Dashkasan	330,700
Xırdalan	Absheron-Khizi	195,700
Mingachevir	Central Aran	102,900

== Bahamas ==
City	District	Population (2022)
Nassau	New Providence	296,522

== Bahrain ==
City	Governorate	Population (2012)
Manama	Capital	297,502
Muharraq	Muharraq	176,583
Hamad Town	Northern	133,550
Riffa	Southern	115,495
A'ali	Northern	100,533

== Bangladesh ==
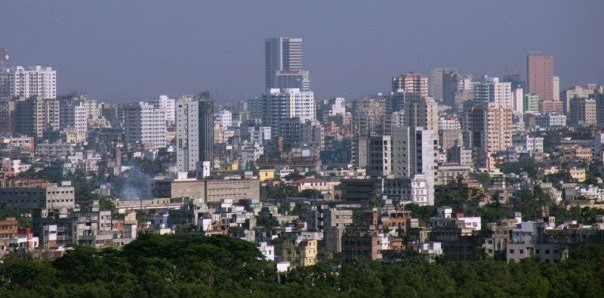
Dhaka, Capital of Bangladesh

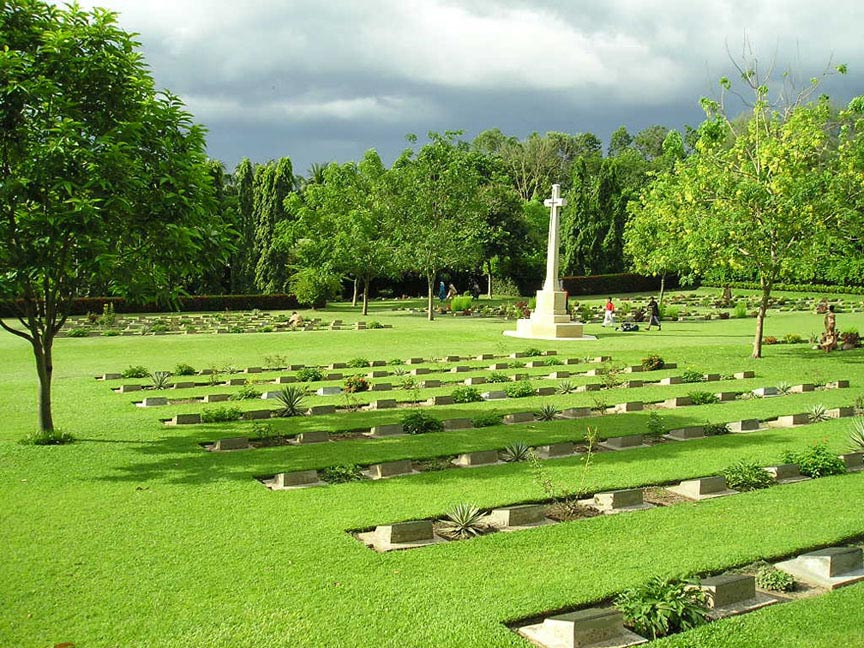
Chittagong

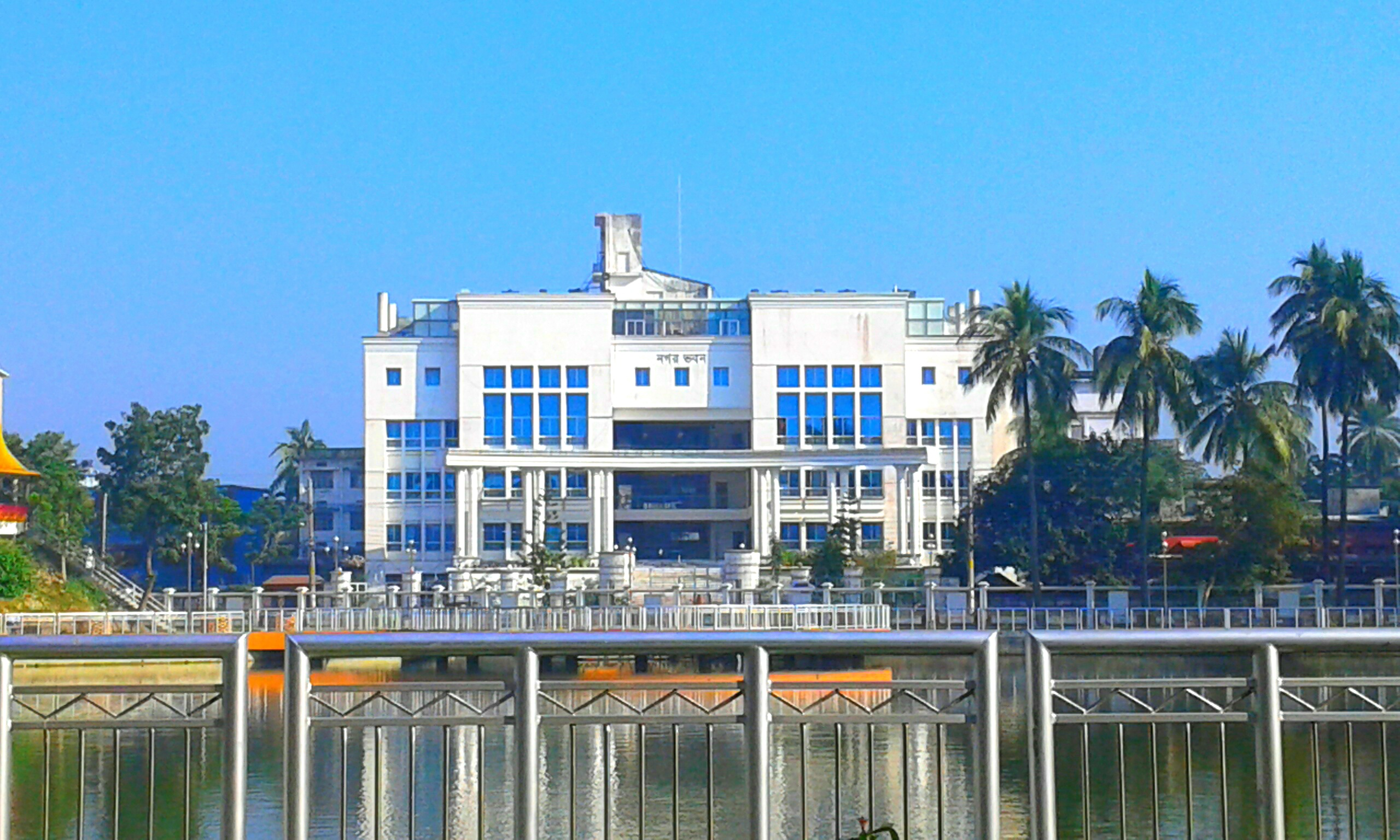
Khulna

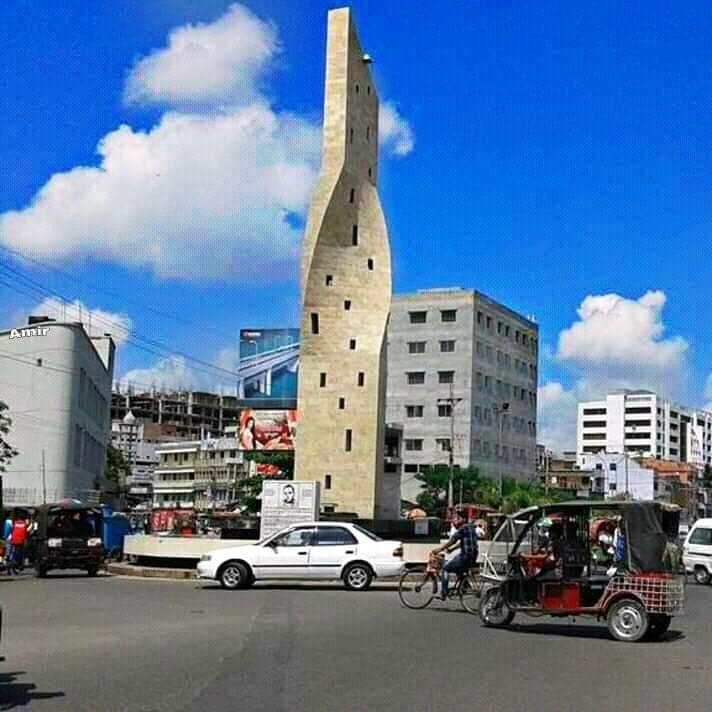
Rajshahi

City	Division	Population (2022)
Barisal	Barisal	448,152
Bogra	Rajshahi	542,420
Brahmanbaria	Chittagong	264,341
Chittagong	Chittagong	5,653,000
Comilla	Chittagong	867,757
Dhaka	Dhaka	36,585,479
Gazipur	Dhaka	2,750,000
Jashore	Khulna	209,330
Khulna	Khulna	1,500,000
Mymensingh	Mymensingh	586,319
Narayanganj	Dhaka	967,951
Rajshahi	Rajshahi	1,007,000
Rangpur	Rangpur	685,754
Sylhet	Sylhet	896,331
Chandpur	Chittagong	203,451
Cox's Bazar	Chittagong	196,385
Feni	Chittagong	234,357
Lakshmipur	Chittagong	132,230
Chowmuhani	Chittagong	100,065
Maijdee	Chittagong	132,198
Rangamati	Chittagong	106,069
Savar	Dhaka	384,105
Faridpur	Dhaka	237,283
Kaliakair	Dhaka	249,111
Sreepur	Barisal	258,973
Gopalganj	Barisal	108,523
Bhairab	Dhaka	156,297
Kishoreganj	Dhaka	138,063
Tarabo	Dhaka	197,672
Ghorashal	Dhaka	101,690
Narsingdi	Dhaka	180,711
Tangail	Dhaka	212,887
Jhenaidah	Khulna	140,271
Kushtia	Khulna	221,806
Magura	Khulna	114,249
Satkhira	Khulna	138,411
Jamalpur	Mymensingh	158,889
Netrakona	Mymensingh	122,299
Sherpur	Mymensingh	123,516
Chapai Nawabganj	Rajshahi	201,005
Sherpur	Rajshahi	146,854
Naogaon	Rajshahi	178,649
Sirajganj	Rajshahi	188,549
Pabna	Rajshahi	176,005
Dinajpur	Rangpur	212,288
Saidpur	Rangpur	143,538
Thakurgaon	Rangpur	100,462

== Barbados ==
City	Parish	Population (2014)
Bridgetown	Saint Michael	110,000

== Belarus ==
City	Region	Population (2023)
Babruysk	Mogilev	208,611
Baranavichy	Brest	172,150
Barysaw	Minsk	136,409
Brest	Brest	342,461
Gomel	Gomel	501,802
Grodno	Grodno	358,717
Lida	Grodno	103,915
Mazyr	Gomel	105,321
Minsk	City of Minsk	1,995,471
Mogilev	Mogilev	353,338
Orsha	Vitebsk	103,658
Pinsk	Brest	124,613
Vitebsk	Vitebsk	359,148

== Belgium ==
City	Region	Population (2024)
Anderlecht	Brussels	125,883
Antwerp	Flanders	542,417
Bruges	Flanders	119,748
Brussels	Brussels	195,546
Charleroi	Wallonia	203,950
Ghent	Flanders	269,191
Liège	Wallonia	194,994
Leuven	Flemish	103,868
Namur	Wallonia	114,007
Schaerbeek	Brussels	129,853

== Benin ==
City	Department	Population (2013)
Cotonou	Littoral	679,012
Porto-Novo	Ouémé	264,320
Parakou	Borgou	255,478
Godomey	Atlantique	253,262
Abomey-Calavi	Atlantique	117,824

== Bhutan ==
City	District	Population (2017)
Thimphu	Thimphu	114,551

== Bolivia ==
City	Department	Population (2012)
Cochabamba	Cochabamba	841,200
El Alto	La Paz	943,500
La Paz	La Paz	816,000
Montero	Santa Cruz	107,200
Oruro	Oruro	302,600
Potosí	Potosí	189,600
Quillacollo	Cochabamba	117,800
Sacaba	Cochabamba	169,400
Santa Cruz	Santa Cruz	1,867,600
Sucre	Chuquisaca	259,300
Tarija	Tarija	247,000
Trinidad	Beni	130,600

== Bosnia and Herzegovina ==
City	Entity	Population (2022)
Sarajevo	Sarajevo Canton	348,363
Banja Luka	Republika Srpska	135,059

== Botswana ==
City	District	Population (2022)
Gaborone	South-East District	246,325
Francistown	North-East District	103,417

== Brazil ==
City	State	Population (2016)
Abaetetuba	Pará	159,000
Abreu e Lima	Pernambuco	100,300
Açailândia	Maranhão	113,100
Aguas Lindas de Goiás	Goiás	217,600
Alagoinhas	Bahia	152,300
Almirante Tamandaré	Paraná	120,000
Altamira	Pará	115,900
Alvorada	Rio Grande do Sul	211,300
Americana	São Paulo	242,000
Ananindeua	Pará	535,500
Anápolis	Goiás	391,700
Angra dos Reis	Rio de Janeiro	207,000
Aparecida de Goiania	Goiás	590,100
Apucarana	Paraná	136,200
Aracaju	Sergipe	664,900
Araçatuba	São Paulo	196,100
Aracruz	Espírito Santo	104,900
Araguaina	Tocantins	183,300
Araguari	Minas Gerais	116,900
Arapiraca	Alagoas	233,000
Arapongas	Paraná	124,800
Araraquara	São Paulo	238,300
Araras	São Paulo	133,500
Araruama	Rio de Janeiro	134,200
Araucária	Paraná	146,200
Araxá	Minas Gerais	107,300
Ariquemes	Rondônia	109,500
Assis	São Paulo	105,000
Atibaia	São Paulo	144,000
Bacabal	Maranhão	104,600
Bagé	Rio Grande do Sul	121,300
Balneário Camboriú	Santa Catarina	145,700
Barbacena	Minas Gerais	138,200
Barcarena	Pará	127,000
Barra do Piraí	Rio de Janeiro	100,700
Barra Mansa	Rio de Janeiro	184,800
Barreiras	Bahia	156,900
Barretos	São Paulo	122,800
Barueri	São Paulo	276,900
Bauru	São Paulo	379,200
Belém	Pará	1,499,600
Belford Roxo	Rio de Janeiro	513,100
Belo Horizonte	Minas Gerais	2,721,500
Bento Gonçalves	Rio Grande do Sul	121,800
Betim	Minas Gerais	444,700
Birigui	São Paulo	124,800
Blumenau	Santa Catarina	361,800
Boa Vista	Roraima	419,600
Botucatu	São Paulo	148,100
Bragança	Pará	128,900
Bragança Paulista	São Paulo	175,500
Brasilia	Distrito Federal	3,039,400
Breves	Pará	103,400
Brusque	Santa Catarina	137,600
Cabo de Santo Agostinho	Pernambuco	208,900
Cabo Frio	Rio de Janeiro	230,300
Cachoeirinha	Rio Grande do Sul	131,200
Cachoeiro de Itapemirim	Espírito Santo	210,500
Caieiras	São Paulo	102,700
Camacari	Bahia	304,300
Camaragibe	Pernambuco	158,800
Cambé	Paraná	107,300
Cametá	Pará	139,300
Campina Grande	Paraíba	411,800
Campinas	São Paulo	1,213,700
Campo Grande	Mato Grosso do Sul	906,000
Campo Largo	Paraná	133,800
Campos dos Goytacazes	Rio de Janeiro	511,100
Canoas	Rio Grande do Sul	348,200
Caraguatatuba	São Paulo	123,300
Carapicuíba	São Paulo	403,100
Cariacica	Espírito Santo	383,900
Caruaru	Pernambuco	365,200
Cascavel	Paraná	332,300
Castanhal	Pará	203,200
Catalão	Goiás	110,900
Catanduva	São Paulo	122,400
Caucaia	Ceará	365,200
Caxias	Maranhão	165,500
Caxias do Sul	Rio Grande do Sul	517,400
Chapecó	Santa Catarina	224,000
Codo	Maranhão	123,100
Colatina	Espírito Santo	123,400
Colombo	Paraná	246,500
Conselheiro Lafaiete	Minas Gerais	129,600
Contagem	Minas Gerais	668,900
Coronel Fabriciano	Minas Gerais	110,200
Corumbá	Mato Grosso do Sul	112,000
Cotia	São Paulo	253,600
Crato	Ceará	133,000
Criciúma	Santa Catarina	217,300
Cubatao	São Paulo	131,600
Cuiabá	Mato Grosso	618,100
Curitiba	Paraná	1,948,600
Diadema	São Paulo	426,700
Divinópolis	Minas Gerais	240,400
Dourados	Mato Grosso do Sul	225,400
Duque de Caxias	Rio de Janeiro	924,600
Embu	São Paulo	276,500
Erechim	Rio Grande do Sul	106,600
Eunápolis	Bahia	114,300
Fazenda Rio Grande	Paraná	102,000
Feira de Santana	Bahia	619,600
Ferraz de Vasconcelos	São Paulo	196,500
Florianópolis	Santa Catarina	508,800
Formosa	Goiás	123,600
Fortaleza	Ceará	2,703,300
Foz do Iguaçu	Paraná	258,200
Franca	São Paulo	355,900
Francisco Morato	São Paulo	175,600
Franco da Rocha	São Paulo	156,400
Garanhuns	Pernambuco	140,500
Goiânia	Goiás	1,536,000
Governador Valadares	Minas Gerais	281,000
Gravatai	Rio Grande do Sul	283,600
Guarapari	Espírito Santo	126,700
Guarapuava	Paraná	182,600
Guaratinguetá	São Paulo	122,500
Guarujá	São Paulo	322,700
Guarulhos	São Paulo	1,392,100
Hortolandia	São Paulo	222,100
Ibirité	Minas Gerais	182,100
Igarassu	Pernambuco	118,300
Iguatu	Ceará	103,000
Ilhéus	Bahia	159,900
Imperatriz	Maranhão	259,300
Indaiatuba	São Paulo	256,200
Ipatinga	Minas Gerais	265,400
Itabira	Minas Gerais	120,900
Itaboraí	Rio de Janeiro	242,500
Itabuna	Bahia	213,600
Itaguaí	Rio de Janeiro	120,900
Itajaí	Santa Catarina	209,000
Itapecerica da Serra	São Paulo	169,100
Itapetininga	São Paulo	158,600
Itapevi	São Paulo	226,500
Itapipoca	Ceará	126,200
Itaquaquecetuba	São Paulo	356,800
Itatiba	São Paulo	114,900
Itu	São Paulo	168,600
Ituiutaba	Minas Gerais	103,900
Itumbiara	Goiás	101,500
Jaboatao dos Guararapes	Pernambuco	691,100
Jacareí	São Paulo	228,200
Jandira	São Paulo	120,200
Japeri	Rio de Janeiro	100,600
Jaraguá do Sul	Santa Catarina	167,300
Jaú	São Paulo	144,800
Jequié	Bahia	161,900
Ji-Paraná	Rondônia	131,600
Joao Pessoa	Paraíba	801,700
Joinville	Santa Catarina	569,900
Juazeiro	Bahia	220,300
Juàzeiro do Norte	Ceará	268,200
Juiz de Fora	Minas Gerais	559,600
Jundiaí	São Paulo	405,700
Lagarto	Sergipe	103,200
Lages	Santa Catarina	158,600
Lauro de Freitas	Bahia	194,600
Lavras	Minas Gerais	101,200
Leme	São Paulo	100,300
Limeira	São Paulo	298,700
Linhares	Espírito Santo	166,500
Londrina	Paraná	553,400
Luziânia	Goiás	196,900
Macae	Rio de Janeiro	239,500
Macapá	Amapá	465,500
Maceió	Alagoas	1,021,700
Magé	Rio de Janeiro	236,300
Manaus	Amazonas	2,094,400
Maraba	Pará	266,900
Maracanau	Ceará	223,200
Maranguape	Ceará	125,100
Maricá	Rio de Janeiro	149,900
Marília	São Paulo	233,600
Maringá	Paraná	403,100
Marituba	Pará	125,400
Mauá	São Paulo	457,700
Mesquita	Rio de Janeiro	171,000
Moji das Cruzes	São Paulo	429,300
Moji-Guaçu	São Paulo	148,300
Montes Claros	Minas Gerais	398,300
Mossoró	Rio Grande do Norte	291,900
Muriaé	Minas Gerais	107,900
Natal	Rio Grande do Norte	877,700
Nilópolis	Rio de Janeiro	158,300
Niterói	Rio de Janeiro	497,900
Nossa Senhora do Socorro	Sergipe	179,700
Nova Friburgo	Rio de Janeiro	185,100
Nova Iguaçu	Rio de Janeiro	797,400
Novo Gama	Goiás	108,400
Nôvo Hamburgo	Rio Grande do Sul	249,100
Olinda	Pernambuco	390,100
Osasco	São Paulo	696,400
Ourinhos	São Paulo	111,100
Paço do Lumiar	Maranhão	119,900
Palhoça	Santa Catarina	161,400
Palmas	Tocantins	279,900
Paragominas	Pará	108,500
Paranaguá	Paraná	151,800
Parauapebas	Pará	196,300
Parintins	Amazonas	112,700
Parnaíba	Piauí	150,200
Parnamirim	Rio Grande do Norte	248,600
Passo Fundo	Rio Grande do Sul	197,800
Passos	Minas Gerais	113,800
Patos	Paraíba	107,100
Patos de Minas	Minas Gerais	149,900
Paulínia	São Paulo	100,100
Paulista	Pernambuco	325,600
Paulo Afonso	Bahia	119,900
Pelotas	Rio Grande do Sul	343,700
Petrolina	Pernambuco	337,700
Petrópolis	Rio de Janeiro	298,200
Pindamonhangaba	São Paulo	162,300
Pinhais	Paraná	128,300
Piracicaba	São Paulo	394,400
Piraquara	Paraná	106,100
Poà	São Paulo	114,700
Poços de Caldas	Minas Gerais	164,900
Ponta Grossa	Paraná	341,100
Porto Alegre	Rio Grande do Sul	1,481,000
Porto Seguro	Bahia	147,400
Porto Velho	Rondônia	511,200
Pouso Alegre	Minas Gerais	145,500
Praia Grande	São Paulo	304,700
Presidente Prudente	São Paulo	223,700
Queimados	Rio de Janeiro	144,500
Recife	Pernambuco	1,625,600
Resende	Rio de Janeiro	126,100
Ribeirao das Neves	Minas Gerais	325,800
Ribeirao Pires	São Paulo	121,100
Ribeirao Prêto	São Paulo	674,400
Rio Branco	Acre	377,100
Rio Claro	São Paulo	201,500
Rio das Ostras	Rio de Janeiro	136,600
Rio de Janeiro	Rio de Janeiro	6,498,800
Rio Grande	Rio Grande do Sul	208,600
Rio Verde	Goiás	212,200
Rondonópolis	Mato Grosso	218,900
Sabára	Minas Gerais	135,200
Salto	São Paulo	115,200
Salvador	Bahia	2,938,100
Santa Bárbara D'Oeste	São Paulo	191,000
Santa Cruz do Capibaribe	Pernambuco	103,700
Santa Cruz do Sul	Rio Grande do Sul	126,800
Santa Luzia	Minas Gerais	217,600
Santa Maria	Rio Grande do Sul	277,300
Santa Rita	Paraíba	135,900
Santana	Amapá	113,900
Santana de Parnaíba	São Paulo	129,300
Santarém	Pará	294,500
Santo André	São Paulo	712,700
Santo Antônio de Jesus	Bahia	102,500
Santos	São Paulo	434,400
São Bernardo do Campo	São Paulo	822,200
São Caetano do Sul	São Paulo	158,800
São Carlos	São Paulo	243,800
São Gonçalo	Rio de Janeiro	1,044,100
São Joao de Meriti	Rio de Janeiro	460,500
São José	Santa Catarina	236,000
São José de Ribamar	Maranhão	176,000
São José do Rio Preto	São Paulo	446,700
São José dos Campos	São Paulo	696,000
São José dos Pinhais	Paraná	302,800
São Leopoldo	Rio Grande do Sul	229,700
São Lourenço da Mata	Pernambuco	111,200
São Luís	Maranhão	1,082,900
São Mateus	Espírito Santo	126,400
São Paulo	São Paulo	12,038,200
São Vicente	São Paulo	358,000
Sapucaia do Sul	Rio Grande do Sul	138,900
Senador Canedo	Goiás	102,900
Serra	Espírito Santo	494,100
Sertãozinho	São Paulo	121,400
Sete Lagoas	Minas Gerais	234,200
Simoes Filho	Bahia	134,700
Sinop	Mato Grosso	132,900
Sobral	Ceará	203,700
Sorocaba	São Paulo	652,500
Sumaré	São Paulo	269,500
Suzano	São Paulo	288,100
Taboao da Serra	São Paulo	275,900
Tailândia	Pará	100,300
Tatuí	São Paulo	117,800
Taubaté	São Paulo	305,200
Teixeira de Freitas	Bahia	159,800
Teófilo Otoni	Minas Gerais	141,500
Teresina	Piauí	847,400
Teresópolis	Rio de Janeiro	174,600
Timon	Maranhão	166,300
Toledo	Paraná	133,800
Três Lagoas	Mato Grosso do Sul	115,600
Trindade	Goiás	119,400
Tubarão	Santa Catarina	103,700
Tucuruí	Pará	108,900
Ubá	Minas Gerais	112,200
Uberaba	Minas Gerais	325,300
Uberlândia	Minas Gerais	669,700
Umuarama	Paraná	109,100
Uruguaiana	Rio Grande do Sul	129,700
Valinhos	São Paulo	122,200
Valparaíso de Goiás	Goiás	156,400
Varginha	Minas Gerais	133,400
Varzea Grande	Mato Grosso	271,300
Varzea Paulista	São Paulo	117,800
Vespasiano	Minas Gerais	120,500
Viamao	Rio Grande do Sul	252,900
Vila Velha	Espírito Santo	479,700
Vitória	Espírito Santo	359,600
Vitória da Conquista	Bahia	346,100
Vitória de Santo Antao	Pernambuco	136,700
Volta Redonda	Rio de Janeiro	263,700
Votorantim	São Paulo	118,900

== Brunei ==
City	District	Population (2021)
Bandar Seri Begawan	Brunei Muara	266,682

== Bulgaria ==
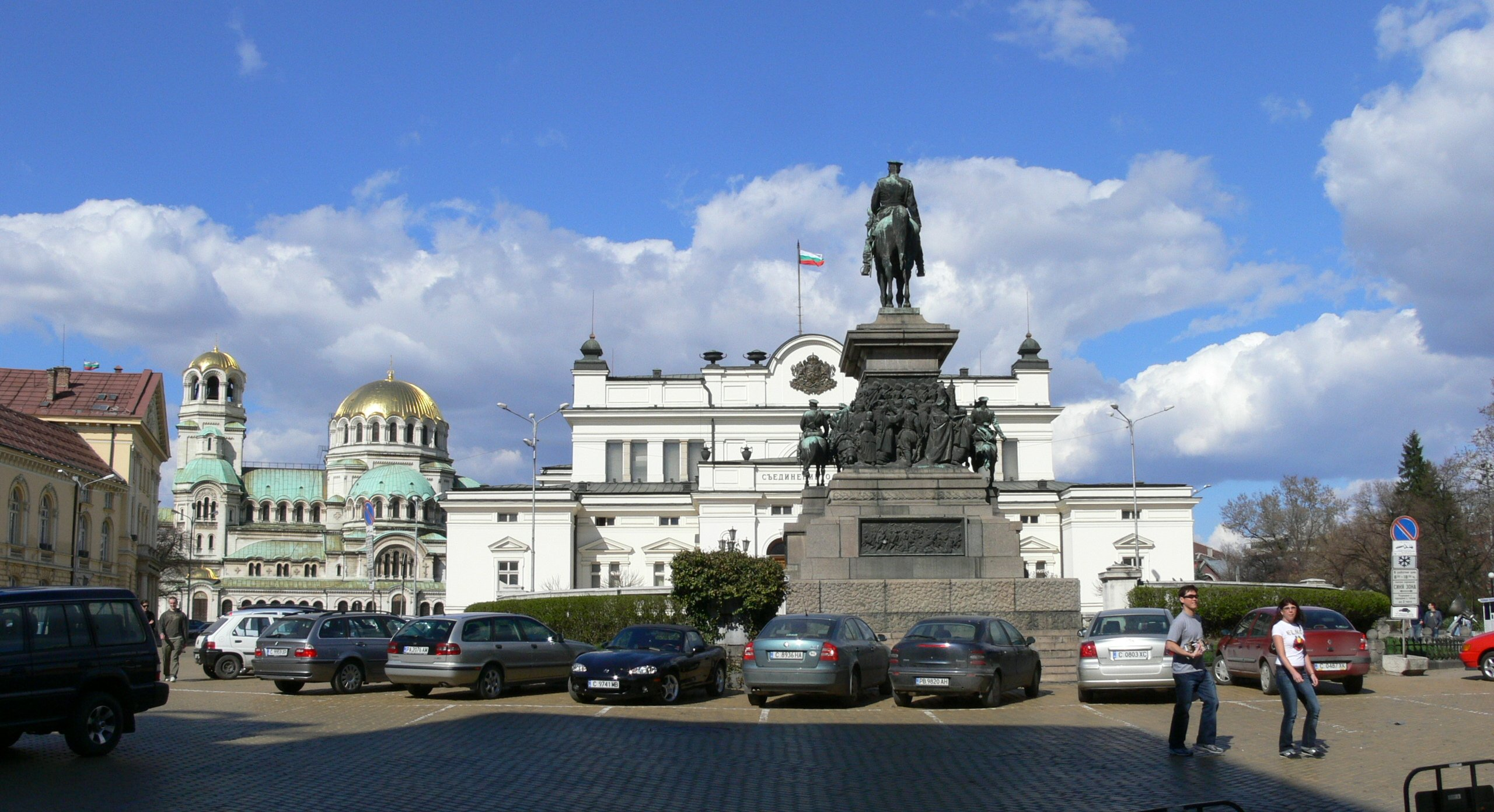
Sofia

City	Province	Population (2022)
Burgas	Burgas	194,993
Pleven	Pleven	110,843
Plovdiv	Plovdiv	321,824
Ruse	Ruse	139,226
Sliven	Sliven	111,392
Sofia	Sofia City	1,280,334
Stara Zagora	Stara Zagora	142,746
Varna	Varna	319,900

== Burkina Faso ==
City	Region	Population (2019)
Banfora	Cascades	117,200
Bobo Dioulasso	Hauts-Bassins	903,800
Kaya	Centre-Nord	122,900
Koudougou	Centre-Ouest	160,200
Ouagadougou	Centre	2,453,400
Ouahigouya	Nord	124,500

== Burundi ==
City	Province	Population (2009)
Bujumbura	Bujumbura Mairie	497,166

== See also ==
- World largest cities
