= List of towns and cities with 100,000 or more inhabitants =

Lists of places with more than 100,000 residents by country name

This is a list of towns and cities in the world believed to have 100,000 or more inhabitants, sorted by countries. Unless otherwise noted, populations are based on United Nations estimates from 2022.

== By country name ==
A-B • C-D-E-F • G-H-I-J-K • L-M-N-O • P-Q-R-S • T-U-V-W-Y-Z

== See also ==
- List of largest cities
- List of cities with over 1 million inhabitants
