= Tunis Governorate =

Governorate of Tunisia

Tunis Governorate ولاية تونس
- Governorate
- Map of Tunisia with Tunis highlighted
- Coordinates: 36°48′0″N 10°10′12″E
- Country: Tunisia
- Created: 21 June 1956
- Capital: Tunis

Government
  - Governor: Imed Boukhris (since 2024)

Area Note: Some sources (e.g. geospatial data) cite 288 km^{2}
  - Total: 346 km^{2} (134 sq mi)
  - Rank: Ranked 24th of 24

Population (2024)
  - Total: 1,075,306
  - Rank: Ranked 1st of 24
  - Density: 3,110/km^{2} (8,050/sq mi)
- Demonym(s): Tunisois (تونسي Tounsi)
- Time zone: UTC+01 (CET)
- Postal prefix: 10xx
- Calling code: 71
- ISO 3166 code: TN-11

Tunis Governorate (ولاية تونس Wilāyat Tūnis; French: Gouvernorat de Tunis) is the smallest and most populated of the twenty-four governorates of Tunisia. It covers an urban and suburban area on the Gulf of Tunis along the north-eastern coast, covering 346 km^{2} (134 sq mi), and had a population of 1,075,306 in the 2024 census. Its capital is the national capital, Tunis.

== Physical geography and economy ==
The Tunis Governorate is the largest industrial center in Tunisia. Located on the Mediterranean Sea, it has a Mediterranean climate with an average annual rainfall of about 470 mm. The region narrows toward the port, forming a slender alluvial belt that extends roughly 20 km westward, encompassing farmland and wetlands such as the brackish Lake of Tunis and the saline Sebkhet Séjoumi. The Medjerda River, originating in Algeria, has heavily diverted mouths in this area; its natural outlet would have discharged into the saltwater harbor around which neighboring provinces now form parts of the central metropolitan area of Tunis. Sebkhet Séjoumi, immediately southwest of the city center, expands during wet periods and receives water from local wadis and urban runoff, while nearby Medjerda irrigation canals support regional agriculture. Its banks feature cultivated land to the west and the small Forêt de Sijoumi to the east, with suburbs mainly surrounding the remaining sides. The urban area covers over half the governorate. The western part of the capital contains a major market and hospital complex, supported by wide roads, flyovers, and three of the country's largest railway stations, making it a highly developed center for trade and connectivity. The governorate includes a container port with ferry connections to Salerno, Civitavecchia, Genoa, Palermo, and Trapani in Italy and Marseille in France. Its Tunis–Carthage International Airport and railway network reinforce its status as a national hub, hosting government offices, the stock exchange, and major business headquarters. Tunis is also an important cultural and tourist destination. The Bardo Museum displays artifacts from across the western Mediterranean, including works in classical and early Islamic traditions. Along with smaller museums, mosques, souqs, traditional hotels and restaurants, nearby headlands, national parks, and beaches, the city attracts both domestic and international visitors.

== Demographics ==
According to the 2024 General Population and Housing Census, Tunis Governorate had a population of 1,075,306, making it the most populous governorate despite being the smallest by area. The population density is approximately 3,107 inhabitants per km^{2} (using the commonly cited area of 346 km^{2}), though some geospatial sources report 288 km^{2}, yielding ~3,734/km^{2}. The governorate shows signs of demographic aging, with a higher proportion of residents over 60 compared to the national average, reflecting urbanization patterns and migration to the capital region. About one-third of Tunisia's population lives in the Greater Tunis area (including adjacent governorates like Ariana, Ben Arous, and Manouba).

=== Tourism ===
Tunis Governorate is a major tourist destination, attracting visitors for its blend of ancient history, Islamic heritage, and Mediterranean coast. Key attractions include:

- The Medina of Tunis, a UNESCO World Heritage Site since 1979, with its winding souqs, traditional architecture, and the 9th-century Zitouna Mosque.
- The Bardo National Museum, housing one of the world's finest collections of Roman mosaics and artifacts from Punic, Roman, and early Islamic periods.
- The ruins of ancient Carthage (partly within the governorate), including the Antonine Baths and archaeological sites.
- Cliff-top villages like Sidi Bou Said (known for blue-and-white houses and panoramic views) and coastal suburbs such as La Marsa with beaches and promenades.
- Nearby natural sites, including the brackish Lake of Tunis and saline Sebkhet Séjoumi wetlands, which support birdwatching and local ecology.

These draw millions annually, supported by Tunis–Carthage International Airport and the port's ferry connections.

== Notable landmarks ==
- Medina of Tunis – Historic core with souqs and mosques.
- Bardo National Museum – Premier collection of mosaics.
- Carthage archaeological site.
- Modern developments like Cité de la Culture (arts complex in Bab El Bhar delegation).

== Administrative divisions ==
Tunis Governorate is divided into twenty-one delegations, listed below with their populations at the 2004, 2014 and 2024 Censuses.

Delegation	Area in km^{2}	Pop'n 2004 Census	Pop'n 2014 Census	Pop'n 2024 Census
Bab El Bhar	7.97	39,806	36,210	30,322
Bab Souika	2.18	33,284	29,185	25,142
Carthage	8.20	20,715	24,216	22,203
Cité El Khadra	21.70	36,818	35,173	30,345
Djebel Djelloud	5.25	26,490	23,638	24,183
El Hraïria	24.12	96,245	110,184	118,229
El Kabaria	10.15	81,261	86,024	83,856
El Menzah	10.02	43,320	41,830	40,738
El Omrane	4.97	40,801	42,208	37,678
El Omrane Supérieur	3.25	62,138	55,513	57,993
El Ouardia	3.93	33,734	32,147	30,143
Ettahrir	1.67	21,956	21,709	19,679
Ezzouhour	2.81	40,434	40,728	35,484
La Goulette	12.35	28,407	45,711	48,382
La Marsa	30.62	77,890	92,987	113,133
Le Bardo	6.78	70,244	71,961	68,799
Le Kram	9.63	58,152	74,132	88,302
Medina	1.50	26,703	21,400	17,376
Sijoumi	2.00	36,171	33,870	28,387
Sidi El Béchir	2.71	29,911	27,749	25,044
Sidi Hassine	64.36	79,381	109,672	129,888

It includes eight municipalities:

1111	Tunis	604,599
1112	Le Bardo	68,799
1113	Le Kram	88,302
1114	La Goulette	48,382
1115	Carthage	17,215
1116	Sidi Bou Said	4,988
1117	La Marsa	113,133
1118	Sidi Hassine	129,888
