= Sidi Hassine =

Coordinates: 36°45′37″N 10°06′46″E

Sidi Hassine سيدي حسين
- Commune
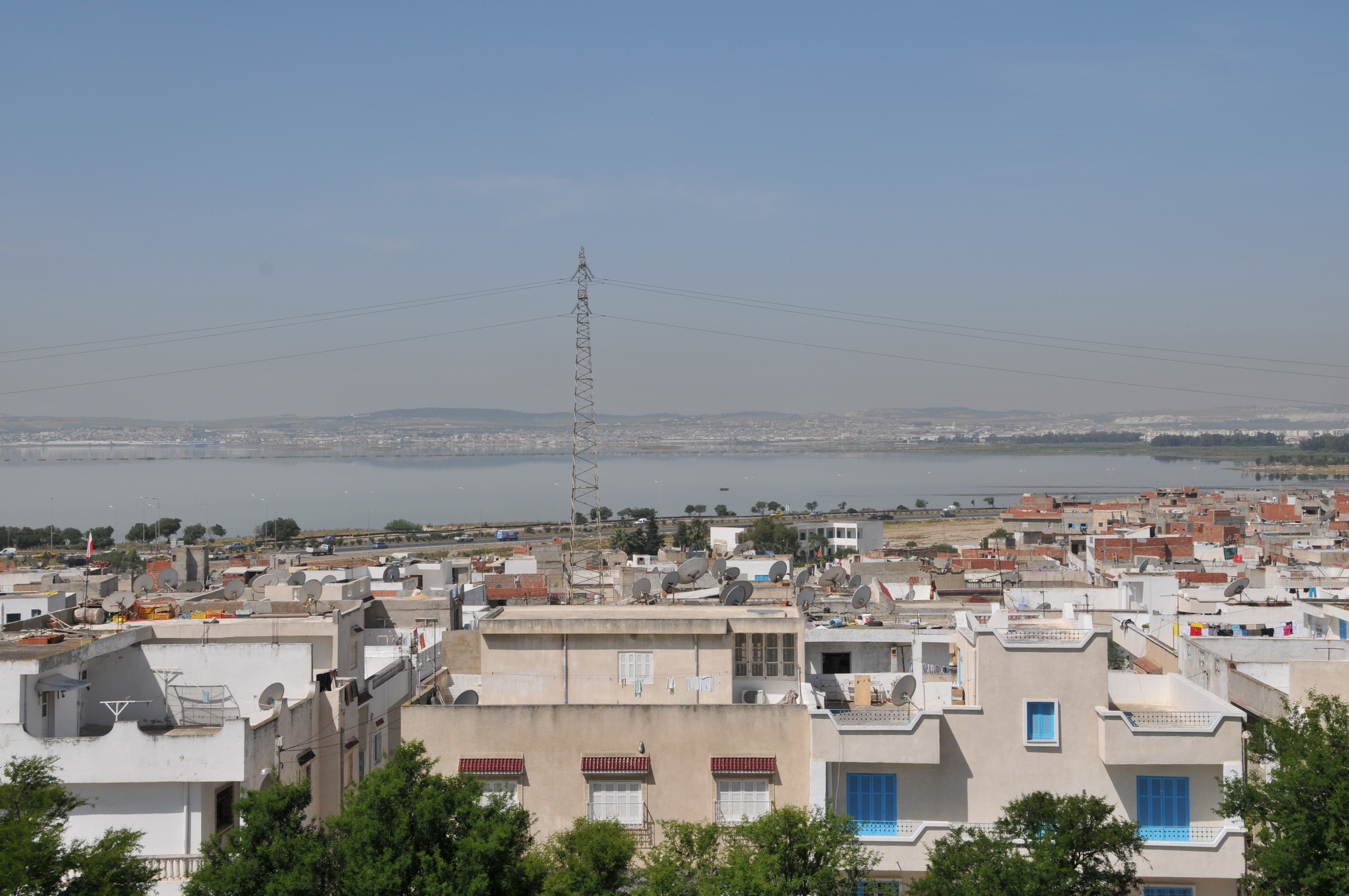
- Interactive map of Sidi Hassine
- Country: Tunisia
- Governorate: Tunis Governorate
- Delegation(s): Sidi Hassine

Population (2023)173,131
  - Total: 173,131
  - Density: 380/sq mi (145/km^{2})
- heavy
- Time zone: UTC+1 (GMT+1)

Sidi Hassine is a town and commune in the Tunis Governorate, Tunisia. As of 2023, it had a population of 173,331.

It formed a district of the municipality of Tunis before obtaining the status of municipality on 11 February 2023.

In 2021 the district became known for protests after the death of Ahmed Ben Ammar, a young man killed in police custody. The next day, a youth participating in the protests was subject to violence by police, sustaining the protest.

== See also ==
- List of cities in Tunisia
