= List of cities with over 1 million inhabitants =

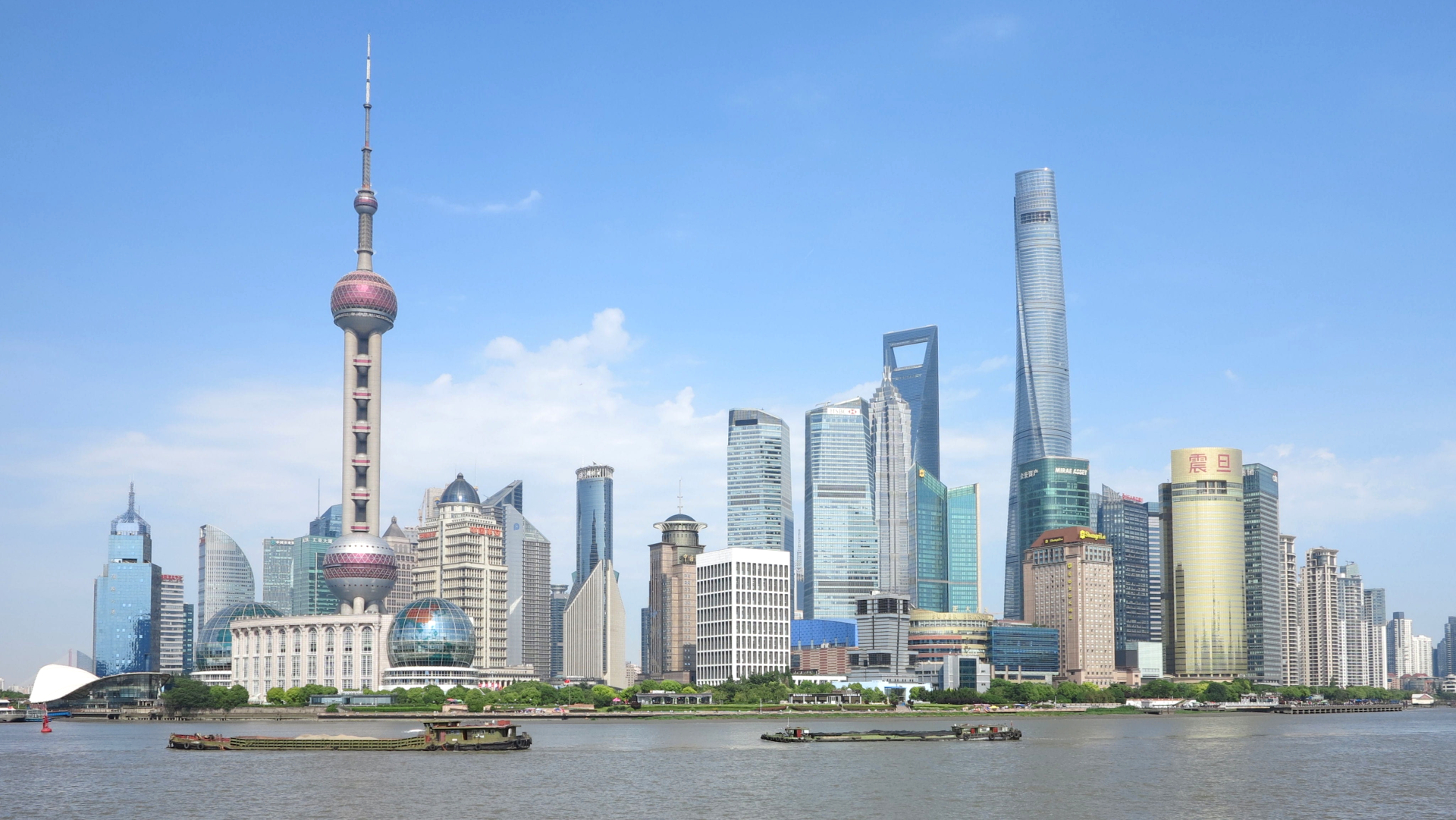
Shanghai

This list contains all cities with one million or more inhabitants. Cities are defined in the political-geographic sense (city proper). The population figures given therefore refer to the city or municipality in the political-administrative sense. In some cases, the population figures refer to capital districts or Metropolises and, in the case of the People's Republic of China, to the urban population of the city in question. In many cases, the city boundaries do not correspond to the settlement structure and the boundaries of metropolitan regions and agglomerations often extend far beyond the administrative city boundaries. In some cases, metropolitan regions and political municipalities cannot be separated, as in the case of metropolitan municipalities or city regions, which exist in some countries. There is no globally standardized definition of what constitutes a city, and municipal divisions differ from country to country.

If only the administrative boundaries of a city were taken into account, Chongqing would be the largest city in the world, with 32 million inhabitants. However, the urban population is significantly smaller at just under 14 million (2020) and is spread across various urban settlements. The city's administrative area is almost as large as Austria and larger than the Czech Republic. It consists mainly of mountains, forest and agricultural areas with a rural settlement structure.

== List ==
The following table sorts cities according to the population within their administrative boundaries at the last available date. The population figures refer in the most cases to the respective municipality within its political boundaries, excluding politically independent suburbs. For Chinese cities, the urban population (urban settlement) of the respective city is given at prefecture, county or district level, which usually include large rural areas. Cities in bold are national capitals. Cities in italic are the largest city in their respective country.

City	Country	Inhabitants	Continent	Year	City definition
Shanghai	China	21,909,814	Asia	2020	Province-level city (urban)
Delhi	India	20,591,874	Asia	2021	Municipal corporation/Union territory
Karachi	Pakistan	20,382,881	Asia	2023	Metropolitan corporation
Beijing	China	18,960,744	Asia	2020	Province-level city (urban)
Shenzhen	China	17,444,609	Asia	2020	Sub-provincial City (urban)
Kinshasa	DR Congo	16,316,000	Africa	2023	Urban area
Guangzhou	China	16,096,724	Asia	2020	Sub-provincial City (urban)
Lagos	Nigeria	15,946,000	Africa	2023	Metropolis
Istanbul	Turkey	15,701,602	Asia/Europe	2024	Metropolitan municipality
Bangalore	India	14,254,786	Asia	2021	Municipal corporation
Tokyo	Japan	14,246,219	Asia	2025	Metropolitan Prefecture
Ho Chi Minh City	Vietnam	14,002,598	Asia	2025	Province-level municipality
Chengdu	China	13,568,357	Asia	2020	Sub-provincial City (urban)
Moscow	Russia	13,274,285	Europe	2025	Federal city
Mumbai	India	13,127,825	Asia	2021	Municipal corporation
Lahore	Pakistan	13,004,135	Asia	2023	Metropolitan corporation/District
São Paulo	Brazil	11,895,578	South America	2024	Municipio
Tianjin	China	11,052,404	Asia	2020	Province-level city (urban)
Jakarta	Indonesia	10,562,088	Asia	2020	Special Capital Region
Wuhan	China	10,494,879	Asia	2020	Sub-provincial City (urban)
Lima	Peru	10,353,700	South America	2025	Metropolitan municipality
Dhaka	Bangladesh	10,278,882	Asia	2022	City corporation (Note: Dhaka North City Corporation and Dhaka South City Corporation)
Hyderabad	India	10,269,000	Asia	2021	Municipal corporation
Cairo	Egypt	9,801,536	Africa	2023	City
Chennai	India	9,722,974	Asia	2021	Municipal corporation
Dongguan	China	9,644,871	Asia	2020	Prefecture-level city (urban)
Chongqing	China	9,580,810	Asia	2020	Province-level city (urban)
Xi’an	China	9,392,938	Asia	2020	Sub-provincial City (urban)
Seoul	South Korea	9,315,066	Asia	2025	Special city (Teukbyeolsi)
Hangzhou	China	9,236,032	Asia	2020	Sub-provincial City (urban)
Mexico City	Mexico	9,209,944	North America	2020	Distrito Federal
London	United Kingdom	9,122,909	Europe	2025	Region
Foshan	China	9,042,509	Asia	2020	Prefecture-level city (urban)
Tehran	Iran	9,039,000	Asia	2021	Municipality (city)
Bangkok	Thailand	8,890,112	Asia	2025	Province-level city
Luanda	Angola	8,816,297	Africa	2024	Province
Hanoi	Vietnam	8,807,523	Asia	2024	Province-level municipality
New York City	United States	8,584,629	North America	2025	City
Ahmedabad	India	8,253,226	Asia	2021	Municipal corporation
Bogotá	Colombia	7,732,161	South America	2020	Distrito Capital
Baghdad	Iraq	7,837,463	Asia	2024	Municipality (city)
Surat	India	7,567,538	Asia	2021	Municipal corporation
Hong Kong	China	7,527,500	Asia	2025	Special administrative region
Nanjing	China	7,519,814	Asia	2020	Sub-provincial City (urban)
Shenyang	China	7,026,358	Asia	2020	Sub-provincial City (urban)
Riyadh	Saudi Arabia	6,924,566	Asia	2022	Municipality (city)
Rio de Janeiro	Brazil	6,729,894	South America	2022	Municipio
Zhengzhou	China	6,461,013	Asia	2020	Prefecture-level city (urban)
Qingdao	China	6,165,279	Asia	2020	Prefecture-level city (urban)
Singapore	Singapore	6,142,180	Asia	2025	Sovereign state
Kolkata	India	6,112,874	Asia	2020	Municipal corporation
Suzhou	China	5,892,892	Asia	2020	Prefecture-level city (urban)
Saint Petersburg	Russia	5,652,922	Europe	2025	Federal city
Changsha	China	5,630,256	Asia	2020	Prefecture-level city (urban)
Abidjan	Côte d'Ivoire	5,616,633	Africa	2021	City (Ville)
Jinan	China	5,452,335	Asia	2020	Sub-provincial City (urban)
Dar es Salaam	Tanzania	5,383,728	Africa	2022	Region-level city
Alexandria	Egypt	5,362,517	Africa	2023	City
Santiago	Chile	5,283,656	South America	2023	City
Kunming	China	5,273,144	Asia	2020	Prefecture-level city (urban)
Harbin	China	5,242,897	Asia	2020	Sub-provincial City (urban)
Ankara	Turkey	5,186,002	Asia	2022	City
Shijiazhuang	China	5,090,440	Asia	2020	Prefecture-level city (urban)
Hefei	China	5,055,978	Asia	2020	Prefecture-level city (urban)
Dalian	China	4,913,879	Asia	2020	Sub-provincial City (urban)
Johannesburg	South Africa	4,803,262	Africa	2022	Metropolitan municipality
Cape Town	South Africa	4,772,846	Africa	2022	Metropolitan municipality
Nairobi	Kenya	4,750,100	Africa	2023	Consolidated city-county
Haiphong	Vietnam	4,664,124	Asia	2024	Province-level municipality
Kano	Nigeria	4,648,400	Africa	2022	Metropolis
Xiamen	China	4,617,251	Asia	2020	Sub-provincial City (urban)
Yangon	Myanmar	4,584,622	Asia	2024	Municipality (city)
Nanning	China	4,582,703	Asia	2020	Prefecture-level city (urban)
Changchun	China	4,557,356	Asia	2020	Sub-provincial City (urban)
Giza	Egypt	4,458,135	Africa	2023	City
Kabul	Afghanistan	4,434,600	Asia	2020	Municipality (city)
Taiyuan	China	4,303,673	Asia	2020	Prefecture-level city (urban)
eThekwini (Durban)	South Africa	4,239,901	Africa	2022	Metropolitan municipality
Bamako	Mali	4,227,569	Africa	2022	Region-level city
Can Tho	Vietnam	4,199,824	Asia	2024	Province-level municipality
Jaipur	India	4,067,826	Asia	2021	Municipal corporation
Ekurhuleni	South Africa	4,066,691	Africa	2022	Metropolitan municipality
Tshwane (Pretoria)	South Africa	4,040,315	Africa	2022	Metropolitan municipality
New Taipei City	Taiwan	4,030,954	Asia	2020	Special municipality
Guiyang	China	4,021,275	Asia	2020	Prefecture-level city (urban)
Wuxi	China	3,956,985	Asia	2020	Prefecture-level city (urban)
Pune	India	3,891,823	Asia	2021	Municipal corporation
Shantou	China	3,890,169	Asia	2020	Prefecture-level city (urban)
Ibadan	Nigeria	3,875,000	Africa	2023	Urban area
Los Angeles	United States	3,869,089	North America	2025	City
Ürümqi	China	3,864,136	Asia	2020	Prefecture-level city (urban)
Zhongshan	China	3,841,873	Asia	2020	Prefecture-level city (urban)
Abuja	Nigeria	3,840,000	Africa	2023	Urban area
Douala	Cameroon	3,816,500	Africa	2025	Municipality (city)
Lucknow	India	3,790,274	Asia	2021	Municipal corporation
Yaoundé	Cameroon	3,762,900	Africa	2025	Municipality (city)
Yokohama	Japan	3,754,840	Asia	2025	Designated city
Ningbo	China	3,731,203	Asia	2020	Prefecture-level city (urban)
Fuzhou	China	3,723,454	Asia	2020	Prefecture-level city (urban)
Jeddah	Saudi Arabia	3,712,917	Asia	2022	Municipality (city)
Faisalabad	Pakistan	3,691,999	Asia	2023	Metropolitan corporation
Berlin	Germany	3,913,644	Europe	2024	State/Urban district
Nagpur	India	3,622,000	Asia	2026	Municipal corporation
Mashhad	Iran	3,619,000	Asia	2021	Municipality (city)
Dubai	United Arab Emirates	3,570,099	Asia	2023	Metropolis
Nanchang	China	3,518,975	Asia	2020	Prefecture-level city (urban)
Madrid	Spain	3,506,730	Europe	2025	Municipio
Algiers	Algeria	3,496,000	Africa	2026	Urban area
Addis Ababa	Ethiopia	3,480,229	Africa	2022	Chartered city
Port Harcourt	Nigeria	3,480,000	Africa	2023	Urban area
Conakry	Guinea	3,407,327	Africa	2025	Municipality (city)
Toronto	Canada	3,271,830	North America	2025	City
Busan	South Korea	3,235,362	Asia	2025	Metropolitan city (Gwangyeoksi)
Chittagong	Bangladesh	3,227,246	Asia	2022	City corporation
Casablanca	Morocco	3,218,036	Africa	2024	Municipality (city)
Ouagadougou	Burkina Faso	3,204,000	Africa	2023	Urban area
Kanpur	India	3,203,932	Asia	2021	Municipal corporation
Changzhou	China	3,187,315	Asia	2020	Prefecture-level city (urban)
Pyongyang	North Korea	3,133,000	Asia	2022	Directly governed city
Buenos Aires	Argentina	3,120,612	South America	2022	Distrito Federal
Tashkent	Uzbekistan	3,112,748	Asia	2025	Municipality (city)
Incheon	South Korea	3,093,590	Asia	2025	Metropolitan city (Gwangyeoksi)
Quezon City	Philippines	3,084,270	Asia	2024	City (Lungsod)
Da Nang	Vietnam	3,065,628	Asia	2024	Province-level municipality
Lanzhou	China	3,012,577	Asia	2020	Prefecture-level city (urban)
Nantong	China	2,987,600	Asia	2020	Prefecture-level city (urban)
Surabaya	Indonesia	2,972,801	Asia	2022	City (Kota)
Brasília	Brazil	2,982,818	South America	2024	Municipio
Kyiv	Ukraine	2,952,301	Europe	2022	City with special status
İzmir	Turkey	2,948,160	Asia	2022	City
Kumasi	Ghana	2,907,000	Africa	2017	Urban area
Huizhou	China	2,900,113	Asia	2020	Prefecture-level city (urban)
Mbuji-Mayi	DR Congo	2,892,000	Africa	2023	Urban area
Xuzhou	China	2,845,552	Asia	2020	Prefecture-level city (urban)
Taichung	Taiwan	2,820,787	Asia	2020	Special municipality
Lubumbashi	DR Congo	2,812,000	Africa	2023	Urban area
Osaka	Japan	2,808,624	Asia	2025	Designated city
Thane	India	2,771,000	Asia	2026	Municipal corporation
Kaohsiung	Taiwan	2,765,932	Asia	2020	Special municipality
Zibo	China	2,750,312	Asia	2020	Prefecture-level city (urban)
Rome	Italy	2,745,062	Europe	2026	Comune
Linyi	China	2,743,843	Asia	2020	Prefecture-level city (urban)
Chicago	United States	2,731,585	North America	2025	City
Bhopal	India	2,707,000	Asia	2026	Municipal corporation
Gazipur	Bangladesh	2,674,697	Asia	2022	City corporation
Guayaquil	Ecuador	2,665,392	South America	2022	Municipio
Baku	Azerbaijan	2,640,400	Asia	2025	Municipality (city)
Taipei	Taiwan	2,602,418	Asia	2020	Special municipality
Damascus	Syria	2,584,771	Asia	2023	Urban area
Wenzhou	China	2,582,017	Asia	2020	Prefecture-level city (urban)
Tangshan	China	2,549,968	Asia	2020	Prefecture-level city (urban)
Sanaa	Yemen	2,545,000	Asia	2017	City
Patna	India	2,534,000	Asia	2026	Municipal corporation
Bandung	Indonesia	2,527,854	Asia	2021	City (Kota)
Medellín	Colombia	2,519,592	South America	2020	Municipio
Gujranwala	Pakistan	2,511,118	Asia	2023	Metropolitan corporation
Bekasi	Indonesia	2,468,448	Asia	2021	City (Kota)
Indore	India	2,463,588	Asia	2020	Municipal corporation
Medan	Indonesia	2,435,252	Asia	2020	City (Kota)
Fortaleza	Brazil	2,428,708	South America	2022	Municipio
Salvador	Brazil	2,417,678	South America	2022	Municipio
Houston	United States	2,397,315	North America	2025	City
Omdurman	Sudan	2,395,159	Africa	2022	Municipality (city)
Agra	India	2,386,000	Asia	2026	Municipal corporation
Mecca	Saudi Arabia	2,385,509	Asia	2022	Municipality (city)
Hohhot	China	2,373,399	Asia	2020	Prefecture-level city (urban)
Daegu	South Korea	2,363,643	Asia	2025	Metropolitan city (Gwangyeoksi)
Visakhapatnam	India	2,358,412	Asia	2021	Municipal corporation
Haikou	China	2,349,239	Asia	2020	Prefecture-level city (urban)
Almaty	Kazakhstan	2,348,103	Asia	2026	Municipality (city)
Nagoya	Japan	2,345,892	Asia	2025	Designated city
Shaoxing	China	2,333,080	Asia	2020	Prefecture-level city (urban)
Mogadishu	Somalia	2,330,700	Africa	2019	Region
Belo Horizonte	Brazil	2,315,560	South America	2022	Municipio
Yantai	China	2,311,885	Asia	2020	Prefecture-level city (urban)
Accra	Ghana	2,291,352	Africa	2023	Metropolis
Rawalpindi	Pakistan	2,284,014	Asia	2023	Metropolitan Corporation
Phnom Penh	Cambodia	2,281,951	Asia	2019	Autonomous municipality
Taoyuan	Taiwan	2,268,807	Asia	2020	Special municipality
Cali	Colombia	2,264,427	South America	2020	Municipio
Luoyang	China	2,230,661	Asia	2020	Prefecture-level city (urban)
Manaus	Brazil	2,279,686	South America	2024	Municipio
Lusaka	Zambia	2,212,301	Africa	2022	District
Zhuhai	China	2,207,090	Asia	2020	Prefecture-level city (urban)
Liuzhou	China	2,204,841	Asia	2020	Prefecture-level city (urban)
Aleppo	Syria	2,203,025	Asia	2023	Urban area
Lomé	Togo	2,188,376	Africa	2022	Urban area
Isfahan	Iran	2,178,000	Asia	2021	Municipality (city)
Multan	Pakistan	2,169,915	Asia	2023	Metropolitan corporation
Brazzaville	Republic of the Congo	2,145,783	Africa	2023	Department
Havana	Cuba	2,137,847	North America	2022	Municipio/Province
Baotou	China	2,104,114	Asia	2020	Prefecture-level city (urban)
Handan	China	2,095,134	Asia	2020	Prefecture-level city (urban)
Caracas	Venezuela	2,089,012	South America	2019	Distrito Capital
Yangzhou	China	2,067,254	Asia	2020	Prefecture-level city (urban)
Bursa	Turkey	2,051,464	Asia	2022	City
Paris	France	2,047,602	Europe	2026	Département/Commune
Vienna	Austria	2,042,036	Europe	2026	State/City
Weifang	China	1,998,405	Asia	2020	Prefecture-level city (urban)
Minsk	Belarus	1,995,471	Europe	2023	County-level City
Kuala Lumpur	Malaysia	1,982,112	Asia	2020	Federal capital city/federal territory
Khartoum	Sudan	1,974,647	Africa	2023	Municipality (city)
Khartoum Bahri	Sudan	1,968,601	Africa	2015	Municipality (city)
Sapporo	Japan	1,964,034	Asia	2025	Designated city
Faridabad	India	1,957,869	Asia	2021	Municipal corporation
Benin City	Nigeria	1,953,000	Africa	2023	Urban area
Baoding	China	1,940,384	Asia	2020	Prefecture-level city (urban)
Montreal	Canada	1,915,366	North America	2025	City
Ghaziabad	India	1,910,118	Asia	2021	Municipal corporation
Santa Cruz de la Sierra	Bolivia	1,903,398	South America	2022	Municipio
Manila	Philippines	1,902,590	Asia	2024	City (Lungsod)
Tangerang	Indonesia	1,895,486	Asia	2020	City (Kota)
Depok	Indonesia	1,893,321	Asia	2021	City (Kota)
Tainan	Taiwan	1,874,917	Asia	2020	Special municipality
Hamburg	Germany	1,862,565	Europe	2024	State/Urban district
Warsaw	Poland	1,861,599	Europe	2024	City with powiat right
Davao City	Philippines	1,848,947	Asia	2024	City (Lungsod)
Peshawar	Pakistan	1,837,741	Asia	2023	Metropolitan Corporation
Amman	Jordan	1,812,059	Asia	2015	Municipality (city)
Tijuana	Mexico	1,810,645	North America	2020	Locality (Localidad)
Datong	China	1,809,505	Asia	2020	Prefecture-level city (urban)
Huai'an	China	1,804,611	Asia	2020	Prefecture-level city (urban)
Varanasi	India	1,804,000	Asia	2026	Municipal corporation
Kampala	Uganda	1,797,722	Africa	2024	Municipality (city)
Jiangmen	China	1,795,459	Asia	2020	Prefecture-level city (urban)
Ludhiana	India	1,779,796	Asia	2021	Municipal corporation
Adana	Turkey	1,779,463	Asia	2022	City
Ganzhou	China	1,778,132	Asia	2020	Prefecture-level city (urban)
Curitiba	Brazil	1,773,718	South America	2022	Municipio
Quito	Ecuador	1,776,364	South America	2022	Municipio
Monrovia	Liberia	1,761,032	Africa	2022	Urban area
Maracaibo	Venezuela	1,752,602	South America	2019	Municipio
Abu Dhabi	United Arab Emirates	1,750,000	Asia	2023	Urban area
Kigali	Rwanda	1,745,555	Africa	2022	Province-level city
Barcelona	Spain	1,731,649	Europe	2025	Municipio
Pimpri-Chinchwad	India	1,729,359	Asia	2011	Municipal corporation
Caloocan	Philippines	1,712,945	Asia	2024	City (Lungsod)
Bucharest	Romania	1,709,458	Europe	2025	County/city
Amritsar	India	1,704,000	Asia	2026	Municipal corporation
Jining	China	1,700,054	Asia	2020	Prefecture-level city (urban)
Semarang	Indonesia	1,688,133	Asia	2022	City (Kota)
Xiangyang	China	1,686,403	Asia	2020	Prefecture-level city (urban)
Budapest	Hungary	1,685,209	Europe	2025	Komitat/city
Navi Mumbai	India	1,685,000	Asia	2026	Municipal corporation
Belgrade	Serbia	1,682,720	Europe	2024	District
Gaziantep	Turkey	1,680,723	Asia	2022	City
Xining	China	1,677,177	Asia	2020	Prefecture-level city (urban)
Zunyi	China	1,675,245	Asia	2020	Prefecture-level city (urban)
Palembang	Indonesia	1,668,848	Asia	2020	City (Kota)
Vadodara	India	1,666,703	Asia	2011	Municipal corporation
Phoenix	United States	1,665,481	North America	2025	City
Kananga	DR Congo	1,664,000	Africa	2023	Urban area
Fukuoka	Japan	1,663,892	Asia	2025	Designated city
Yinchuan	China	1,662,948	Asia	2020	Prefecture-level city (urban)
Kunshan	China	1,652,159	Asia	2020	County-level city (urban)
Kota	India	1,650,281	Asia	2021	Municipal corporation
Beirut	Lebanon	1,650,000	Asia	2017	Urban area
Ecatepec de Morelos	Mexico	1,643,623	North America	2020	Locality (Localidad)
Astana	Kazakhstan	1,639,176	Asia	2026	Municipality (city)
Novosibirsk	Russia	1,637,266	Asia	2025	Municipality (city)
Calgary	Canada	1,612,834	North America	2025	City
Sharjah	United Arab Emirates	1,610,000	Asia	2023	Urban area
Gwalior	India	1,608,000	Asia	2026	Municipal corporation
Daqing	China	1,604,027	Asia	2020	Prefecture-level city (urban)
Wuhu	China	1,598,165	Asia	2020	Prefecture-level city (urban)
Karaj	Iran	1,592,492	Asia	2016	Municipality (city)
Jabalpur	India	1,588,000	Asia	2026	Municipal corporation
Coimbatore	India	1,580,000	Asia	2026	Municipal corporation
León	Mexico	1,579,803	North America	2020	Locality (Localidad)
Huế	Vietnam	1,578,600	Asia	2024	Province-level municipality
Philadelphia	United States	1,574,281	North America	2025	Consolidated city-county
Shiraz	Iran	1,565,572	Asia	2016	Municipality (city)
Kawasaki	Japan	1,561,132	Asia	2025	Designated city
Tabriz	Iran	1,558,693	Asia	2016	Municipality (city)
Nouakchott	Mauritania	1,558,100	Africa	2026	Capital district
Vijayawada	India	1,556,000	Asia	2026	Municipal corporation
Mianyang	China	1,549,499	Asia	2020	Prefecture-level city (urban)
San Antonio	United States	1,548,422	North America	2025	City
Yekaterinburg	Russia	1,548,187	Asia	2025	Municipality (city)
Auckland	New Zealand	1,547,200	Oceania	2025	Urban area
Puebla	Mexico	1,542,232	North America	2020	Locality (Localidad)
Putian	China	1,539,389	Asia	2020	Prefecture-level city (urban)
Ulaanbaatar	Mongolia	1,539,252	Asia	2021	Province/City
Madurai	India	1,531,000	Asia	2026	Municipal corporation
Mosul	Iraq	1,529,384	Asia	2024	Municipality (city)
N'Djamena	Chad	1,521,900	Africa	2019	Municipality (city)
Qinhuangdao	China	1,520,199	Asia	2020	Prefecture-level city (urban)
Raipur	India	1,519,000	Asia	2026	Municipal corporation
Zhuzhou	China	1,510,148	Asia	2020	Prefecture-level city (urban)
Jilin	China	1,509,292	Asia	2020	Prefecture-level city (urban)
Munich	Germany	1,505,005	Europe	2024	Urban district
Ciudad Juárez	Mexico	1,501,551	North America	2020	Locality (Localidad)
Kōbe	Japan	1,497,630	Asia	2025	Designated city
Recife	Brazil	1,494,586	South America	2022	Municipio
Córdoba	Argentina	1,493,668	South America	2022	Urban settlement
Harare	Zimbabwe	1,491,740	Africa	2022	Municipality (city)
Hyderabad	Pakistan	1,487,098	Asia	2023	Metropolitan corporation
Nashik	India	1,486,973	Asia	2011	Municipal corporation
Yiwu	China	1,481,384	Asia	2020	County-level city (urban)
Xingtai	China	1,480,754	Asia	2020	Prefecture-level city (urban)
Anshan	China	1,480,332	Asia	2020	Prefecture-level city (urban)
Daejeon	South Korea	1,469,299	Asia	2025	Metropolitan city (Gwangyeoksi)
Quanzhou	China	1,469,157	Asia	2020	Prefecture-level city (urban)
Cixi	China	1,457,510	Asia	2020	Prefecture-level city (urban)
Guwahati	India	1,439,000	Asia	2026	Municipal corporation
Goiânia	Brazil	1,437,366	South America	2022	Municipio
Niamey	Niger	1,437,000	Africa	2023	Urban area
Solapur	India	1,432,000	Asia	2026	Municipal corporation
Gwangju	South Korea	1,431,903	Asia	2025	Metropolitan city (Gwangyeoksi)
Kyōto	Japan	1,431,713	Asia	2025	Designated city
Makassar	Indonesia	1,423,877	Asia	2020	City (Kota)
Kisangani	DR Congo	1,423,000	Africa	2023	Urban area
Kharkiv	Ukraine	1,421,125	Europe	2022	Municipality (city)
Pointe-Noire	Republic of the Congo	1,420,612	Africa	2023	Department
Hubli-Dharwad	India	1,418,000	Asia	2026	Municipal corporation
Tai’an	China	1,416,591	Asia	2020	Prefecture-level city (urban)
Jinjiang	China	1,416,151	Asia	2020	County-level city (urban)
Medina	Saudi Arabia	1,411,599	Asia	2022	Municipality (city)
Nanyang	China	1,407,616	Asia	2020	Prefecture-level city (urban)
San Diego	United States	1,406,106	North America	2025	City
Porto Alegre	Brazil	1,404,269	South America	2022	Município
Quetta	Pakistan	1,401,362	Asia	2023	Metropolitan corporation
Zhanjiang	China	1,400,709	Asia	2020	Prefecture-level city (urban)
Prague	Czech Republic	1,397,880	Europe	2025	Obec (city)
Dammam	Saudi Arabia	1,386,166	Asia	2022	Municipality (city)
Guadalajara	Mexico	1,385,621	North America	2020	Locality (Localidad)
Chandigarh	India	1,379,895	Asia	2021	Union territory
Brisbane	Australia	1,375,301	Oceania	2026	Local government area
Konya	Turkey	1,365,287	Asia	2022	City
Milan	Italy	1,362,863	Europe	2026	Comune
Guilin	China	1,361,244	Asia	2020	Prefecture-level city (urban)
Bareilly	India	1,359,000	Asia	2026	Municipal corporation
South Tangerang	Indonesia	1,354,350	Asia	2020	City (Kota)
Yancheng	China	1,353,475	Asia	2020	Prefecture-level city (urban)
Zaozhuang	China	1,349,883	Asia	2020	Prefecture-level city (urban)
Rosario	Argentina	1,348,725	South America	2022	Department
Taizhou	China	1,348,327	Asia	2020	Prefecture-level city (urban)
Freetown	Sierra Leone	1,347,559	Africa	2024	Municipality (city)
Saitama	Japan	1,345,016	Asia	2025	Designated city
Shangrao	China	1,342,220	Asia	2020	Prefecture-level city (urban)
Weihai	China	1,339,645	Asia	2020	Prefecture-level city (urban)
Zhangjiakou	China	1,339,384	Asia	2020	Prefecture-level city (urban)
Moradabad	India	1,334,000	Asia	2026	Municipal corporation
Jiangyin	China	1,331,352	Asia	2020	County-level city (urban)
Kazan	Russia	1,329,825	Europe	2025	Municipality (city)
Dallas	United States	1,329,491	North America	2025	City
Tegucigalpa	Honduras	1,326,460	North America	2023	Municipio
Antalya	Turkey	1,322,766	Asia	2022	City
Antananarivo	Madagascar	1,321,269	Africa	2020	Municipality (city)
Gurgaon	India	1,320,000	Asia	2026	Municipal corporation
Aligarh	India	1,316,000	Asia	2026	Municipal corporation
Mombasa	Kenya	1,311,860	Africa	2023	Consolidated city-county
Meerut	India	1,309,023	Asia	2011	Municipal corporation
Taguig	Philippines	1,308,085	Asia	2024	City (Lungsod)
Maoming	China	1,307,802	Asia	2020	Prefecture-level city (urban)
Sofia	Bulgaria	1,303,813	Europe	2025	Province-level city
Belém	Brazil	1,303,403	South America	2022	Município
Jalandhar	India	1,296,000	Asia	2026	Municipal corporation
Shymkent	Kazakhstan	1,294,050	Asia	2026	Municipality (city)
Heze	China	1,293,767	Asia	2020	Prefecture-level city (urban)
Basra	Iraq	1,293,052	Asia	2024	Municipality (city)
Guarulhos	Brazil	1,291,771	South America	2022	Municipio
Rajkot	India	1,286,995	Asia	2011	Municipal corporation
Onitsha	Nigeria	1,285,000	Africa	2018	Urban area
Yichang	China	1,284,305	Asia	2020	Prefecture-level city (urban)
Tbilisi	Georgia	1,282,574	Asia	2025	Region-level city
Dakar	Senegal	1,278,469	Africa	2023	Department
Tiruchirappalli	India	1,276,000	Asia	2026	Municipal corporation
Shubra El Kheima	Egypt	1,275,700	Africa	2023	City
Tangier	Morocco	1,275,428	Africa	2024	Municipality (city)
Barranquilla	Colombia	1,275,264	South America	2020	Municipio
Montevideo	Uruguay	1,271,513	South America	2026	Department
Xinxiang	China	1,271,350	Asia	2020	Prefecture-level city (urban)
Bhubaneswar	India	1,266,000	Asia	2026	Municipal corporation
Zapopan	Mexico	1,257,547	North America	2020	Locality (Localidad)
Huainan	China	1,255,619	Asia	2020	Prefecture-level city (urban)
Nanchong	China	1,254,455	Asia	2020	Prefecture-level city (urban)
Chaozhou	China	1,254,007	Asia	2020	Prefecture-level city (urban)
Kirkuk	Iraq	1,249,197	Asia	2024	Municipality (city)
Bukavu	DR Congo	1,249,000	Africa	2023	Urban area
Salem	India	1,248,000	Asia	2026	Municipal corporation
Kalyan-Dombivli	India	1,246,381	Asia	2011	Municipal corporation
Jieyang	China	1,242,906	Asia	2020	Prefecture-level city (urban)
Dushanbe	Tajikistan	1,242,600	Asia	2024	City
Edmonton	Canada	1,238,295	North America	2025	City
Panama City	Panama	1,235,062	North America	2022	District
Port-au-Prince	Haiti	1,234,742	North America	2019	Commune
Changshu	China	1,230,599	Asia	2020	County-level city (urban)
Fushun	China	1,228,890	Asia	2020	Prefecture-level city (urban)
Callao	Peru	1,226,200	South America	2025	Constitutional Province
Guatemala City	Guatemala	1,221,739	North America	2023	Municipio
Suwon	South Korea	1,221,616	Asia	2025	Specific city (Si)
Vasai-Virar	India	1,221,233	Asia	2011	Municipal corporation
Mira-Bhayandar	India	1,217,000	Asia	2026	Municipal corporation
Krasnoyarsk	Russia	1,211,756	Asia	2025	Municipality (city)
Mysore	India	1,204,759	Asia	2021	Municipal corporation
Qom	Iran	1,201,158	Asia	2016	Municipality (city)
Hargeisa	Somalia	1,200,000	Africa	2019	City
Nizhny Novgorod	Russia	1,198,245	Europe	2025	Municipality (city)
Qingyuan	China	1,197,581	Asia	2020	Prefecture-level city (urban)
Batam	Indonesia	1,196,396	Asia	2020	City (Kota)
Arequipa	Peru	1,195,700	South America	2025	City
Kaifeng	China	1,193,802	Asia	2020	Prefecture-level city (urban)
Srinagar	India	1,192,792	Asia	2011	Municipal corporation
Xianyang	China	1,192,776	Asia	2020	Prefecture-level city (urban)
Fuyang	China	1,191,810	Asia	2020	Prefecture-level city (urban)
Nelson Mandela Bay (Gqeberha)	South Africa	1,190,496	Africa	2022	Metropolitan municipality
Jiaxing	China	1,188,321	Asia	2020	Prefecture-level city (urban)
Ottawa	Canada	1,188,114	North America	2025	City
Anyang	China	1,187,772	Asia	2020	Prefecture-level city (urban)
Doha	Qatar	1,186,023	Asia	2020	Municipality
Hengyang	China	1,185,130	Asia	2020	Prefecture-level city (urban)
Ahvaz	Iran	1,184,788	Asia	2016	Municipality (city)
Birmingham	United Kingdom	1,176,960	Europe	2025	Metropolitan Borough/City
Fès	Morocco	1,182,963	Africa	2024	Municipality (city)
Chelyabinsk	Russia	1,176,770	Asia	2025	Municipality (city)
Tripoli	Libya	1,176,000	Africa	2022	Urban settlement
Hiroshima	Japan	1,172,423	Asia	2025	Designated city
Aurangabad	India	1,171,330	Asia	2011	Municipal corporation
Ufa	Russia	1,166,098	Europe	2025	Municipality (city)
Bandar Lampung	Indonesia	1,166,066	Asia	2020	City (Kota)
Lilongwe	Malawi	1,162,544	Africa	2023	Municipality (city)
Mandalay	Myanmar	1,162,500	Asia	2024	Municipality (city)
Dhanbad	India	1,161,561	Asia	2011	Municipal corporation
Iribarren (Barquisimeto)	Venezuela	1,159,062	South America	2019	Município
Kaduna	Nigeria	1,158,000	Africa	2023	Urban area
Krasnodar	Russia	1,154,885	Asia	2025	Municipality (city)
Samara	Russia	1,154,223	Europe	2025	Municipality (city)
Rizhao	China	1,147,175	Asia	2020	Prefecture-level city (urban)
Rostov-on-Don	Russia	1,143,123	Europe	2025	Municipality (city)
Monterrey	Mexico	1,142,952	North America	2020	Locality (Localidad)
Yerevan	Armenia	1,141,100	Asia	2025	Region-level city
Campinas	Brazil	1,139,047	South America	2022	Município
Dazhou	China	1,135,817	Asia	2020	Prefecture-level city (urban)
Naypyidaw	Myanmar	1,129,322	Asia	2024	Union Territory
Bobo-Dioulasso	Burkina Faso	1,129,000	Africa	2023	Urban area
Luzhou	China	1,128,479	Asia	2020	Prefecture-level city (urban)
Yueyang	China	1,125,448	Asia	2020	Prefecture-level city (urban)
Zhenjiang	China	1,123,813	Asia	2020	Prefecture-level city (urban)
Bishkek	Kyrgyzstan	1,120,827	Asia	2022	Municipality (city)
Touba	Senegal	1,120,824	Africa	2023	Rural Commune
Prayagraj	India	1,117,094	Asia	2011	Municipal corporation
Thiruvananthapuram	India	1,116,000	Asia	2026	Municipal corporation
Islamabad	Pakistan	1,108,872	Asia	2023	Metropolitan corporation
Baoji	China	1,107,702	Asia	2020	Prefecture-level city (urban)
Mwanza	Tanzania	1,104,521	Africa	2022	Municipality (city)
Ulsan	South Korea	1,103,509	Asia	2025	Metropolitan City (Gwangyeoksi)
Omsk	Russia	1,101,367	Asia	2025	Municipality (city)
Yibin	China	1,100,737	Asia	2020	Prefecture-level city (urban)
Changde	China	1,100,719	Asia	2020	Prefecture-level city (urban)
Sendai	Japan	1,096,951	Asia	2025	Designated city
Chifeng	China	1,093,068	Asia	2020	Prefecture-level city (urban)
Diyarbakır	Turkey	1,087,786	Asia	2022	City
Yongin	South Korea	1,085,182	Asia	2025	Specific city (Si)
Huzhou	China	1,083,953	Asia	2020	Prefecture-level city (urban)
Suqian	China	1,081,559	Asia	2020	Prefecture-level city (urban)
Maputo	Mozambique	1,080,277	Africa	2017	Province-level city
Wanzhou	China	1,078,149	Asia	2020	District (urban)
Bengbu	China	1,077,704	Asia	2020	Prefecture-level city (urban)
Ranchi	India	1,073,440	Asia	2011	Municipal corporation
Nezahualcóyotl	Mexico	1,072,676	North America	2020	Locality (Localidad)
Howrah	India	1,072,161	Asia	2011	Municipal corporation
Lianyungang	China	1,071,019	Asia	2020	Prefecture-level city (urban)
Lu’an	China	1,069,940	Asia	2020	Prefecture-level city (urban)
Bhiwandi	India	1,067,000	Asia	2026	Municipal corporation
Trujillo	Peru	1,063,700	South America	2025	City
Managua	Nicaragua	1,061,054	North America	2022	Municipio
Saharanpur	India	1,061,000	Asia	2026	Municipal corporation
Zhangjiagang	China	1,055,893	Asia	2020	County-level city (urban)
Changzhi	China	1,047,461	Asia	2020	Prefecture-level city (urban)
Pingdingshan	China	1,045,966	Asia	2020	Prefecture-level city (urban)
Bogor	Indonesia	1,043,070	Asia	2020	City (Kota)
Voronezh	Russia	1,041,722	Europe	2025	Municipality (city)
Jinhua	China	1,040,948	Asia	2020	Prefecture-level city (urban)
Mersin	Turkey	1,040,507	Asia	2022	City
São Luís	Brazil	1,037,775	South America	2022	Municipio
Goyang	South Korea	1,036,961	Asia	2025	Specific city (Si)
Zhaoqing	China	1,035,810	Asia	2020	Prefecture-level city (urban)
Asmara	Eritrea	1,035,000	Africa	2022	Urban area
Jodhpur	India	1,033,918	Asia	2011	Municipal corporation
Matola	Mozambique	1,032,197	Africa	2017	Municipality (city)
Shangqiu	China	1,031,123	Asia	2020	Prefecture-level city (urban)
Ashgabat	Turkmenistan	1,030,063	Asia	2022	City
Qiqihar	China	1,029,522	Asia	2020	Prefecture-level city (urban)
Santo Domingo Este	Dominican Republic	1,029,117	North America	2022	Municipio
Santo Domingo	Dominican Republic	1,029,110	North America	2022	Municipio
Cartagena	Colombia	1,028,736	South America	2020	Municipio
Jerusalem	Israel	1,028,366	Asia	2023	Metropolis
Fort Worth	United States	1,028,117	North America	2025	City
Hwaseong	South Korea	1,027,532	Asia	2025	Specific city (Si)
Perm	Russia	1,027,518	Europe	2025	Municipality (city)
Cologne	Germany	1,024,210	Europe	2024	Urban district
Jinzhou	China	1,021,478	Asia	2020	Prefecture-level city (urban)
Tshikapa	DR Congo	1,020,468	Africa	2023	Urban area
Liaocheng	China	1,020,430	Asia	2020	Prefecture-level city (urban)
Zamboanga City	Philippines	1,018,849	Asia	2024	City (Lungsod)
Jacksonville	United States	1,017,689	North America	2025	City
Xinyang	China	1,014,843	Asia	2020	Prefecture-level city (urban)
Marrakesh	Morocco	1,014,813	Africa	2024	Municipality (city)
Yuyao	China	1,013,866	Asia	2020	County-level city (urban)
Rui’an	China	1,012,731	Asia	2020	County-level city (urban)
Volgograd	Russia	1,012,219	Europe	2025	Municipality (city)
Gorakhpur	India	1,012,000	Asia	2026	Municipal corporation
Odesa	Ukraine	1,010,537	Europe	2022	Municipality (city)
Vientiane	Laos	1,009,300	Asia	2023	Province-level Prefecture
Austin	United States	1,002,632	North America	2025	City
Erbil	Iraq	1,001,219	Asia	2024	Municipality (city)
Stockholm	Sweden	1,000,962	Europe	2026	Municipality

== By country ==
This list is based on the data from the previous paragraph table. It excludes countries with only one city above one million inhabitants.

	Country	Number of cities	Number of cities (At least 5 million inhabitants)	Number of cities (At least 10 million inhabitants)
1	China	136	24	7
2	India	64	8	4
3	Russia	16	2	1
4	Brazil	15	2	1
5	Indonesia	14	1	1
6	Japan	12	1	1
6	United States	12	1	0
8	South Korea	11	1	0
9	Mexico	10	1	0
9	Pakistan	10	2	2
9	Turkey	10	2	1
12	Nigeria	8	1	1
12	Iran	8	1	0
14	DR Congo	7	1	1
15	South Africa	6	0	0
15	Taiwan	6	0	0
15	Philippines	6	0	0
15	Vietnam	6	2	1
19	Canada	5	0	0
19	Colombia	5	1	0
19	Iraq	5	1	0
19	Saudi Arabia	5	1	0
23	Egypt	4	2	0
23	Germany	4	0	0
23	Morocco	4	0	0
23	Peru	4	1	1
28	Argentina	3	0	0
28	Bangladesh	3	1	1
28	Kazakhstan	3	0	0
28	Myanmar	3	0	0
28	Sudan	3	0	0
28	Ukraine	3	0	0
28	United Arab Emirates	3	0	0
28	Venezuela	3	0	0
36	Algeria	2	0	0
36	Burkina Faso	2	0	0
36	Cameroon	2	0	0
36	Dominican Republic	2	0	0
36	Ecuador	2	0	0
36	Ghana	2	0	0
36	Italy	2	0	0
36	Kenya	2	0	0
36	Mozambique	2	0	0
36	Republic of the Congo	2	0	0
36	Spain	2	0	0
36	Senegal	2	0	0
36	Somalia	2	0	0
36	Syria	2	0	0
36	Tanzania	2	1	0
36	United Kingdom	2	1	0

== Cities previously over 1 million people ==
The following table has cities that used to be over 1 million people in the past century, but have since declined under the 1 million mark.

City	Country	Continent	Peak Population	Year	Current Population	Year
Detroit	United States	North America	1,849,568	1950	649,095	2025
Kitakyushu	Japan	Asia	1,680,000	1979	904,289	2025
Nova Iguaçu	Brazil	South America	1,286,337	1991	785,867	2022
Naples	Italy	Europe	1,226,594	1971	908,082	2025
Dnipro	Ukraine	Europe	1,191,971	1989	968,502	2022
Turin	Italy	Europe	1,167,968	1971	856,745	2025
Glasgow	United Kingdom	Europe	1,127,825	1938	650,300	2024
Donetsk	Ukraine	Europe	1,109,102	1989	901,645	2022
San Jose	United States	North America	1,013,240	2020	989,814	2025
Benxi	China	Asia	1,000,128	2010	808,221	2020

== List (top 20 by administrative boundaries) ==
The following table lists city administrations by population, including full population inside administrative boundaries for Chinese cities.

City	Country	Inhabitants	Area in km^{2}	People per km^{2}	Continent	Year	City definition
Chongqing	China	32,054,159	82,403	389	Asia	2020	Province-level city
Shanghai	China	24,870,895	6,200	4,011	Asia	2020	Province-level city
Beijing	China	21,893,095	16,411	1,334	Asia	2020	Province-level city
Chengdu	China	20,937,757	12,055	1,737	Asia	2020	Sub-provincial City
Delhi	India	20,591,874	1,484	13,875	Asia	2021	Municipal corporation/Union territory
Karachi	Pakistan	20,382,881	3,527	5,779	Asia	2023	Metropolitan corporation
Guangzhou	China	18,676,605	7,434	2,512	Asia	2020	Sub-provincial City
Shenzhen	China	17,494,398	1,992	8,784	Asia	2020	Sub-provincial City
Istanbul	Turkey	15,907,951	5,196	3,062	Asia/Europe	2022	Metropolitan municipality
Kinshasa	DR Congo	14,565,700	9,965	1,462	Africa	2023	Province-level city
Bengaluru	India	14,254,786	741	19,237	Asia	2021	Municipal corporation
Tokyo	Japan	14,047,594	2,194	6,413	Asia	2020	Metropolitan prefecture
Tianjin	China	13,866,009	11,610	1,194	Asia	2020	Province-level city
Mumbai	India	13,127,825	603	21,770	Asia	2021	Municipal corporation
Moscow	Russia	13,010,112	2,510	5,183	Europe	2021	Federal city
Lahore	Pakistan	13,004,135	1,772	7,339	Asia	2023	Metropolitan corporation/District
Suzhou	China	12,748,262	9,102	1,401	Asia	2020	Prefecture-level city
Zhengzhou	China	12,600,574	7,565	1,666	Asia	2020	Prefecture-level city
Wuhan	China	12,447,718	8,575	1,452	Asia	2020	Sub-provincial City
Xi’an	China	12,183,280	10,107	1,205	Asia	2020	Sub-provincial City

== See also ==
- List of largest cities
- List of largest cities throughout history
- List of towns and cities with 100,000 or more inhabitants
- List of cities in the Americas by population
