= City limits =

Defined boundary or border of a city

City limit sign in Hukou Township.

A city limit is a border of a city. The term is often used as the plural city limits, for the entire boundary. The area within city limits can be called the city proper. Related are the corporate limits (or corporation limits) of a city, which define the jurisdiction of its municipal corporation. In some countries, city limits can be expanded through municipal annexation.

== United Kingdom ==
In the UK, city boundaries are more difficult to define, and the specific concept of a city boundary as opposed to e.g. a town or borough boundary, is less useful: British cities are defined as any town or local authority area, regardless of area or population size, that has been granted letters patent as a royal prerogative. In smaller cities, such as Wells (pop. approx. 10,000) or Gloucester (pop. approx. 100,000), the boundary will be that governed by the city council, though in certain cases such as Carlisle, this may include large rural and even uninhabited areas which are largely distinct from the main settlement. In the case of larger cities, such as Birmingham (pop. approx. 1,000,000), local government will be administered by a metropolitan borough but the wider metro area may also have a county or regional combined authority. London, the largest city, is the original model for this in the UK: almost all of the metropolitan area (known as Greater London) is governed by the Greater London Authority. However, as a regional administration its powers are limited, and the 32 boroughs plus the ancient City of London contained within it are responsible for the majority of services.

Although British city (or borough) boundaries are often important for defining local services such as refuse collection and planning (zoning), in most places they form a low level of local government. Law enforcement, education and other services are generally defined by county boundaries (or larger areas), and central government is responsible for the National Health Service (NHS Scotland or NHS Wales outside of England).

Planning (zoning) law around British cities is generally determined by green belt laws, which prevent building in the countryside surrounding large and medium-sized towns and cities.

== United States ==
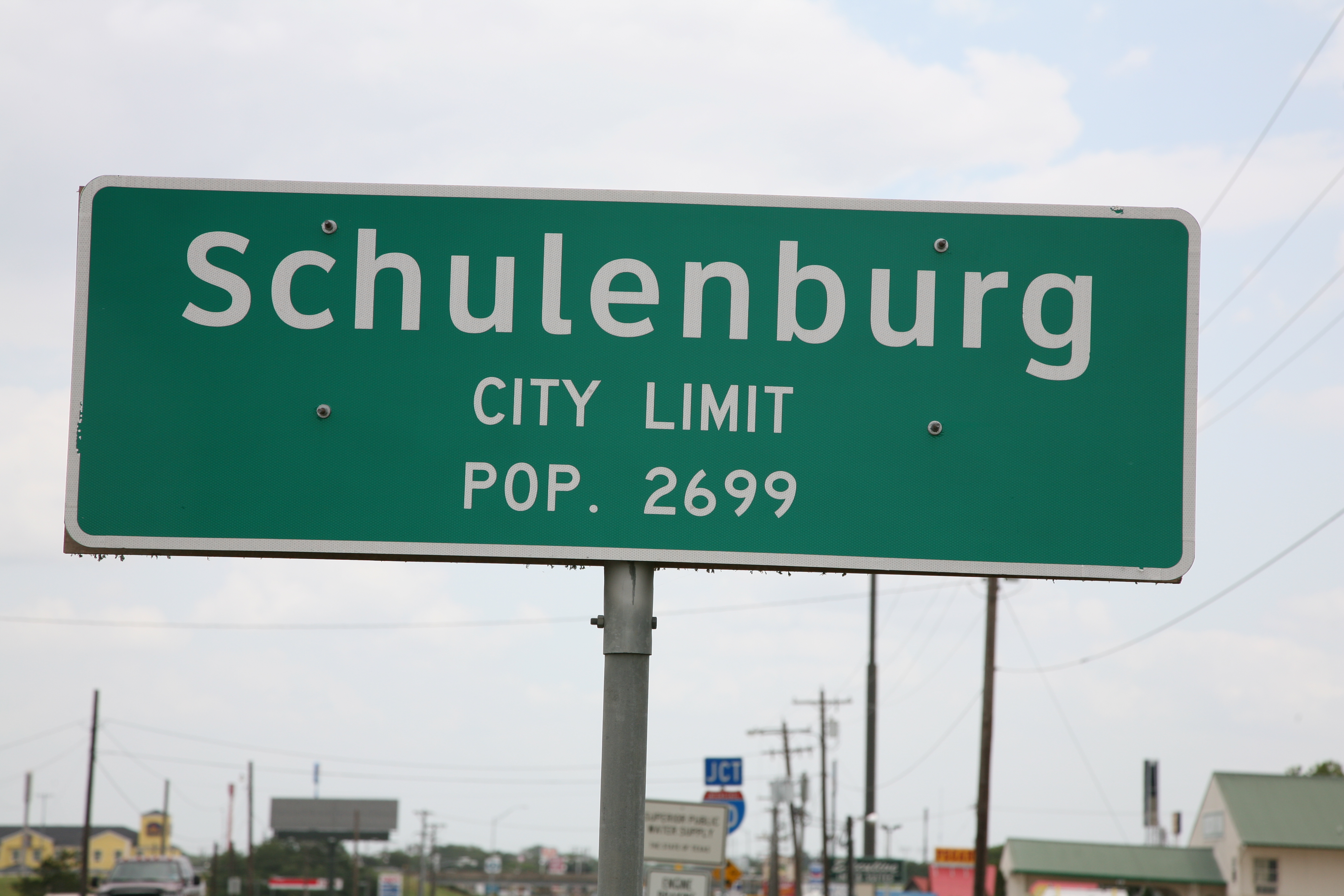
Large signs like this one in Schulenburg, Texas, are often posted at the city limits of American cities.

In the United States, such limits are usually formally described in a state, provincial, or territorial law (or an appropriate regulation) as being under the control of the municipal corporation or agency that constitutes the city government. It is customary to indicate city limits with signs on freeways, highways, and arterial roads.

Property within a city limit is subject to city taxation and city regulation, and expects city services. Areas outside any city's limit are considered to be unincorporated, and in most U.S. states they are by default regulated and taxed by the county. In others, areas outside a city's limit fall within another type of local government, such as the civil township (a division of a county). Cities and towns may have extraterritorial jurisdiction beyond their limits, typically for zoning purposes. The distance this extends varies based on the population or area of the city, or which "class" it is considered to be under state law.

Home rule within a city's limit is usually exercised by the mayor (executive branch) and city council (legislative branch). Home rule outside the city's limit is usually exercised by the county commission (which is often both legislative and executive), or the township's board of supervisors. Even without home rule, the county, as a unit of state government, also has certain powers and responsibilities even within the limits of its cities, including the sheriff that performs evictions, runs the county jail that all city and county police departments take arrested persons to, and guards the courthouse for the county's state court even though it is usually within the city limit of the county seat. Elections and health departments are also common county responsibilities which include all cities. (City residents still pay some county taxes for these reasons.)

If a city chooses to have its own emergency services, they generally only operate within the city's limits, except for mutual aid (typically among fire departments) in case of disaster. Telephone companies also must keep track of changing a city's limit to ensure that calls to 9-1-1 are routed to the appropriate public-safety answering point, if the city operates a PSAP separate from the county. Calls from mobile phones are usually routed based on the location of the base station rather than the calling party, so these (along with landline calls to non-emergency telephone numbers) must be handled manually by the telephone operator or dispatcher, determining whether the caller or incident is within a particular city limit or not so that the proper authorities may be sent.

A city's limit may extend into more than one county, which can complicate certain matters of policing and taxation. (For example, sales tax revenue collected in a city by one county may not be spent in another part of the city outside that county.) Where a city merges its government with that of its county to become a consolidated city-county, the city limit is usually considered to be expanded to occupy all of the previously unincorporated area of the county, while other existing municipalities continue to exist but are permanently locked into their city's limit without the possibility of annexation (except possibly into a neighboring county). An independent city's limit separates it from being in any county at all. Similarly, cities and towns may or may not be considered part of the township[s] they are in.

City limits or boundaries in California are regulated by Local Agency Formation Commissions (LAFCO).

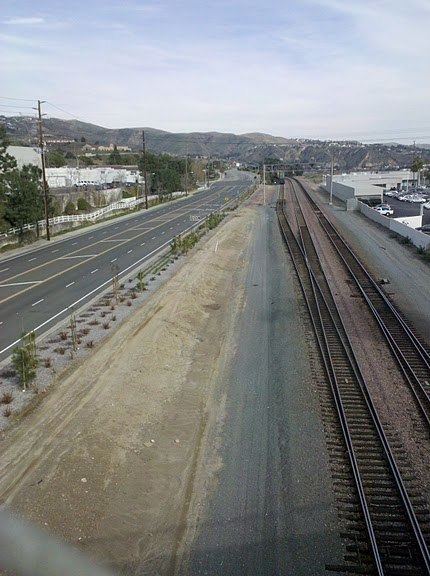
Rail tracks and roads often separate or bound cities. In this case, a BNSF right of way and Esperanza Road separate the strip mall on the left, which is in Yorba Linda, from the car dealership on the right, which is in Anaheim.

City, town, and village limits are not usually coterminous with post office locations or ZIP codes, and the USPS even considers some places to be "unacceptable" for use on mail. (For example, parts of Sandy Springs within its city limit but outside 30328 must use "Atlanta, GA" instead.) School districts and other special-purpose districts may be overlaid on cities, or cities may choose to have their own — however, these are often under other authorities.

A Town's limit was often a radius from a train depot, and several still remain this way.

== See also ==
- List of cities proper by population
- Pomerium
