= Metropolitan Corporation =

Metropolitan Corporation may refer to:

- Metropolitan Corporation of Greater Winnipeg
- Metropolitan Corporation (Pakistan)
