= Christophe Crombez =

Political economist

Christophe Crombez is a political economist at KU Leuven and Stanford University.

== Biography ==
Crombez obtained a Licentiate in Applied Economics from KU Leuven (1989), and a Ph.D. in Business (Political Economics) from Stanford University (1994).

He has held visiting positions at the Istituto Italiano di Scienze Umane, the University of Florence, the University of Michigan, the University of Illinois, Northwestern University, the European University Institute in Florence, the University of Antwerp, and Leti University at St. Petersburg.

Since 1994 he is Professor of Political Economy at KU Leuven, and since 1999 he has held various positions at Stanford University, currently as Senior Research Scholar at the Freeman Spogli Institute for International Studies.

At KU Leuven, he is a senior member of the research unit of managerial economics, strategy and innovation at the faculty for economics and business. Furthermore, he is a member of the Leuven Centre for Global Governance Studies, LICOS, and VIVES in Leuven.

In Belgium he is often consulted by the public radio and television broadcaster, VRT, as a specialist of US politics and elections.

== Work ==
His research mainly focuses on European Union politics and procedures, and business-government relations. He studies the impact of EU institutions and their impact on policies, EU institutional reform, lobbying in the EU, and electoral laws and their consequences in parliamentary political systems.

== Publications ==
His publications include work in The Journal of Politics, European Union Politics, the Journal of European Public Policy, the Journal of Theoretical Politics, Legislative Studies Quarterly, the British Journal of Political Science, and the European Journal of Political Research.
