= Cedric Ryngaert =

- Born: 22 August 1978 (age 48); Kortrijk, Belgium
- Occupations: Lawyer, academic, and author
- Awards: Veni grant Henri Rolin international law prize (Brussels); NWO-Vidi award ERC Starting Grant

Academic background
- Education: Master in Law (lic. jur.); PhD in Law (Jurisdiction in International Law)
- Alma mater: Leuven University

Cedric Ryngaert is a lawyer, academic, and author. He is a Professor and Chair of Public International Law, and Head of the Department of International and European Law at Utrecht University. He is most known for his research on the law of jurisdiction, non-state actors, immunities, and international organizations.

Ryngaert has published over 300 papers, and book chapters on topics related to the role of international law in the context of domestic courts, sanctions, and international responsibility. He is the author/co-author of 2 books, entitled Jurisdiction in International Law, and Selfless Intervention: The Exercise of Jurisdiction in the Common Interest, and the co-editor of International Prosecutors, and Non-State Actors in International Law. He is the Editor-in-Chief of the Netherlands International Law Review, and the Utrecht Law Review, and serves as a member of the Advisory Committee on Public International Law, advising the Dutch Ministry of Foreign Affairs. From 2008 until 2017, he was a Member of the Board of Human Rights and International Legal Discourse.

== Education ==
Ryngaert was born on 22 August 1978 in Kortrijk, Belgium. He attended Leuven University, from which he earned his Master in Law in 2001, and then completed his Doctoral degree in law, under the supervision of Jan Wouters, in 2007.

== Career ==
Following his Doctoral degree, Ryngaert held appointment as assistant professor of Public International Law at Utrecht University. He was promoted to associate professor in 2011, and became Professor in 2014. During his tenure at Utrecht University, he was also concurrently appointed by Leuven University as Assistant and later associate professor of Public International Law from 2008 until 2014.

Ryngaert also held administrative appointments in his career. He was a faculty member of the research board and doctoral commission at Leuven University until 2014. At Utrecht University, he has been appointed as Head of the Department of International and European Law since 2018.

== Research and work ==
Ryngaert's research examines the law of jurisdiction, with particular attention on pathways that lead to sustainability, institutions for open societies, and security in open societies (SOS). He authored a book entitled Jurisdiction in International Law in 2015 about the areas of law where jurisdiction is most contentious: criminal, antitrust, securities, discovery, and international humanitarian and human rights law. Michael Waibel is of the view that the book "holds out a utopian benchmark where States exercise jurisdiction solely in the interest of furthering global welfare, based on specific jurisdictional rules for each field of law." He further describes the book to be a "comprehensive analysis" of the admissible geographical reach of State legislative power, which highlights "transatlantic jurisdictional wrangles" that are limited to US and European State practice.

His work also examines the position of non-state actors as law-makers and law-takers in the context of international law. He addresses questions about whether these different positions can or should be separated from each other. In 2015, Ryngaert co-edited the book, Non-State Actors in International Law, with Math Noortmann. The book highlights that the position of non-state actors in international law changes with the functional and theoretical perspectives of the observer. Marcos D Kotlik described the book as being focused on "constraints of state-centric approaches in accurately depicting the role and status of non-state actors in the international arena." More recently, Ryngaert authored a book, Selfless Intervention: Exercising Jurisdiction in the Common Interest, and explored several concepts of international law, such as jurisdiction, sovereignty, and territoriality. He investigated the ways in which purpose of the law of jurisdiction undergoes a shift from protecting national interests to furthering international concerns.

While discussing criminal law as a mechanism to hold corporations to account, Ryngaert performed a case-study on the Dutch criminal law system and argued that criminal liability can be based on violations of a corporate duty of care violation, on the other hand jurisdiction can be grounded on the principles of territoriality, nationality, and universality. He also published a paper on "Embassy Bank Accounts and State Immunity from Execution" with an intention to introduce an approach which has the capability to bring a balance between the interests of states and creditors while doing justice to the creditor's right of access to a court. He discussed how the United States is continuously weaponizing economic sanctions to accelerate its foreign policy agenda. Having discussed that, he highlighted the inauspicious impacts of secondary sanctions, and the role that third states and the EU are playing to counter these sanctions through various non-judicial mechanisms, such as blocking statutes, special purpose vehicles to circumvent the reach of sanctions, or even countermeasures. Moreover, Ryngaert has focused his research to identify the jurisdictional opportunities and pitfalls of criminal (public law) and civil/tort (private law) litigation against PMCs in domestic courts.

== Awards and honors ==
- 2009 - Veni grant
- 2012 - Henri Rolin international law prize (Brussels)
- 2012 - NWO-Vidi award
- 2013 - ERC Starting Grant 2012/2013

== Bibliography ==
=== Books ===
- International Prosecutors (2012) ISBN 9780199554294
- Jurisdiction in International Law, 2nd Edition (2015) ISBN 9780191002212
- Non-State Actors in International Law (2015) ISBN 9781509901869
- Selfless Intervention: The Exercise of Jurisdiction in the Common Interest (2020) ISBN 9780192592705

=== Selected articles ===
- Ryngaert, C. (2008). Litigating abuses committed by private military companies. European Journal of International Law, 19(5), 1035–1053.
- Ryngaert, C., & Sobrie, S. (2011). Recognition of states: International law or realpolitik? The practice of recognition in the wake of Kosovo, South Ossetia, and Abkhazia. Leiden journal of international law, 24(2), 467–490.
- Wouters, J., Ryngaert, C., & Cloots, S. (2013). The international legal framework against corruption: achievements and challenges. Melbourne Journal of International Law, 14(1), 205–280.
- Ryngaert, C. (2013). Embassy bank accounts and state immunity from execution: doing justice to the financial interests of creditors. Leiden Journal of International Law, 26(1), 73–88.
- Ryngaert, C. (2018, March). Accountability for corporate human rights abuses: Lessons from the possible exercise of Dutch National Criminal Jurisdiction over multinational Corporations. In Criminal Law Forum (Vol. 29, No. 1, pp. 1–24). Springer Netherlands.
- Ruys, T., & Ryngaert, C. (2020). Secondary sanctions: a weapon out of control? The international legality of, and European Responses to, US secondary sanctions. British Yearbook of International Law.
