= Jan Wouters (legal scholar) =

Belgian academic (born 1964)

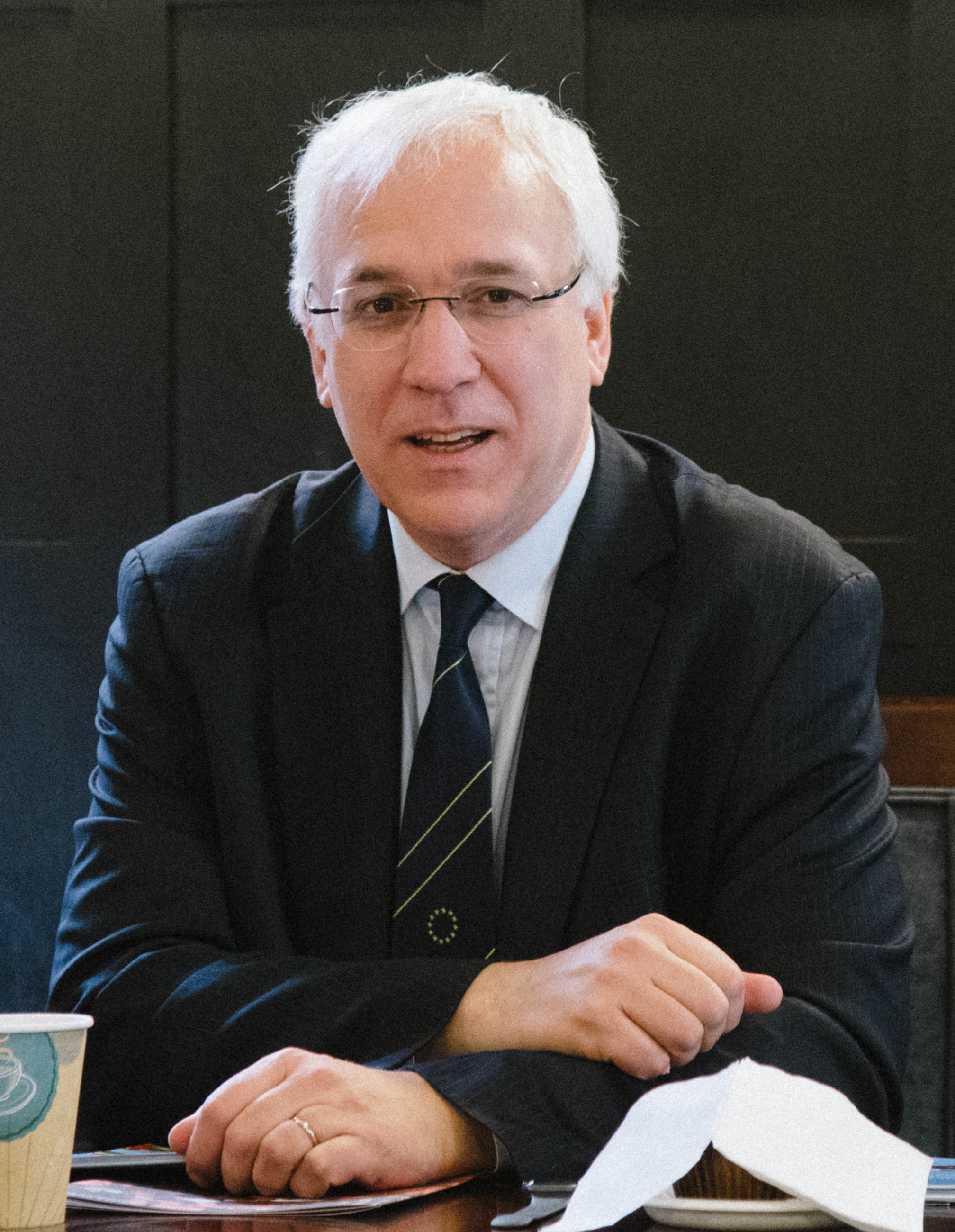
- Born: 14 July 1964 (age 62); Deurne, Belgium
- Occupation: Legal scholar

Academic background
- Education: University of Antwerp

Jan Maria Florent Wouters (born 14 July 1964) is a Belgian academic. He is Jean Monnet Chair, and Professor of International Law and International Organizations at KU Leuven, where he is also Director of its Centre for Global Governance Studies and Institute for International Law.

== Education ==
Wouters earned a Bachelor of Philosophy degree in 1984, and Lic. Juris in 1987, both at the University of Antwerp. In 1990 he obtained a Master of Laws at Yale Law School, and was visiting researcher at Harvard Law School (1990-1991). In 1996, he obtained a PhD in law at KU Leuven, with a doctoral thesis focused on the freedom of establishment of business enterprises within the European Union.

== Career ==
Wouters teaches public international law, international organizations, the law of the World Trade Organization and humanitarian and security law at KU Leuven. He is a visiting professor at the College of Europe (Bruges), SciencesPo (Paris) and LUISS University (Rome), where he teaches on the law of EU external relations. He also teaches in the Master of Laws in International Economic Law (IELPO) at the University of Barcelona and in the European Master's in Human Rights and Democratisation (EMA, EIUC, Venice). He was Référendaire at the European Court of Justice (1991-1994). In addition, he practises law at Linklaters, Brussels.

== Honours and distinctions ==
- Member, Advisory Board, Centre for Multilevel Federalism, Delhi, India, since January 2015
- Senior Visiting Fellow, the Graduate Institute, Geneva, Spring 2014
- International Chair, Luiss University, Rome, Spring 2014
- Visiting Professor, Université Nice Sophia Antipolis, Spring 2014
- Senior Visiting Fellow, Institute of Advanced Studies, University of Bologna, 2013
- Visiting Professor, Faculty of Law, Pontificia Universidad Católica de Chile
- Senior Visiting Fellow, European Union Institute for Security Studies, Paris, 2012
- Fellow, Netherlands Institute for Advanced Study in the Humanities and Social Sciences (NIAS), 2010
- Honorary President, United Nations Association Flanders – Belgium (Vereniging voor de Verenigde Naties), since June 2009 (President from 2003 to 2009 and since 2013)
- Jean Monnet Chair ad personam European Union and Global Governance granted by European Commission (2009)
- Member of the Royal Flemish Academy of Belgium for Sciences and Arts (since 2008)
- Fernand Braudel Fellow, European University Institute, 2008
- Honorary Member, Association of International Relations ("Kring Internationale Betrekkingen", Leuven), since 2002
- Stibbe Prize, 1997
- Walter Leën Prize for Social Law, 1996
- Rotary Foundation Fellow, 1990–91
- Francqui Fellow, Belgian American Educational Foundation, 1989–90

== Publications ==
- Legal Advisers in International Organizations (2023)
- Contestation and Polarization in Global Governance: European Responses (2023)
- The G20, Development and the UN Agenda 2030 (2023)
- EU Industrial Policy in the Multipolar Economy (2022)
- Research Handbook on Global Governance, Business and Human Rights (2022)
- The Nexus Between Organized Crime and Terrorism. Types, Developmental Conditions and Policies (2022)
- The Rule of Law and Areas of Limited Statehood (2021)
- Japan, the European Union and Global Governance (2021)
- The Law of EU External Relations: Cases, Materials and Commentary on the EU as an International Legal Actor (2021)
- The European Union and Human Rights: Analysis, Cases and Materials (2021)
- Can We Still Afford Human Rights? Critical Reflections on Universality, Proliferation and Costs (2020)
- The European Union and Human Rights: Law and Policy (2020)
- Internationaal Recht in Kort Bestek. Van Co-existentie, Coöperatie en Integratie van Staten tot Global Governance (2020)
- Le statut juridique des standards publics et privés dans les relations économiques internationales (2020)
- The Belt and Road Initiative and Global Governance (2020)
- Assessing the 2019 European Parliament Elections (2020)
- The Faces of Human Rights (2019)
- Changing Borders in Europe: Exploring the Dynamics of Integration, Differentiation and Self-Determination in the European Union (2019)
- General Principles of Law and the Coherence of International Law (2019)
- Parliamentary Cooperation and Diplomacy in EU External Relations (2019)
- International Law: a European Perspective (2018)
- The Commons and a New Global Governance (2018)
- Global Governance (2018)
- The G7, Anti-Globalism and the Governance of Globalization (2018)
- EU Human Rights and Democratization Policies: Achievements and Challenges (2018)
- EU Energy Law and Policy (2017)
- Commercial Uses of Space and Space Tourism. Legal and Policy Aspects (2017)
- International Organizations and Member State Responsibility (2016)
- Judicial Decisions on the Law of International Organizations (2016)
- Armed Conflicts and the Law (2016)
- Verenigde Naties: Mensenwerk (2015)
- Global Governance of Labour Rights (2015)
- The Contribution of International and Supranational Courts to the Rule of Law (2015)
- Global Governance and Democracy: A Multidisciplinary Analysis (2015)
- China, the EU and the Developing World (2015)
- The Law of EU External Relations (2013)
- National Human Rights Institutions in Europe (2013)
- The EU's Role in Global Governance (2013)
- China, the European Union and Global Governance (2012)
- Private Standards and Global Governance (2012)
- Informal International Lawmaking (2012)
- International Prosecutors (2012)
- The European Union and Multilateral Governance (2012)
- Upgrading the EU's Role as Global Actor (2011)
- Accountability for Human Rights Violations by International Organizations (2010)
- Belgium in the Security Council (2009)
- European Constitutionalism Beyond Lisbon (2009)
- The Europeanisation of International Law (2008)
- Multilevel Regulation and the EU (2008)
- The World Trade Organization. A Legal and Institutional Analysis (2007)
- The United Nations and the European Union (2006)
- Legal Instruments in the Fight Against International Terrorism (2004)

In addition, he is Editor of the International Encyclopedia of Intergovernmental Organizations, and Deputy Director of the Revue Belge de Droit International. He regularly advises international organizations and trains international officials, and is coordinator of a large-scale FP7 Programme FRAME, "Fostering Human Rights Among European (External and Internal) Policies" and of the InBev-Baillet Latour EU China Chair at KU Leuven.
