= Extraterritorial jurisdiction =

Concept in law

Extraterritorial jurisdiction (ETJ) is the legal ability of a government to exercise authority beyond its normal boundaries.

Any authority can claim ETJ over any external territory they wish. However, for the claim to be effective in the external territory (except by the exercise of force), it must be agreed either with the legal authority in the external territory, or with a legal authority that covers both territories. When unqualified, ETJ usually refers to such an agreed jurisdiction, or it will be called "claimed ETJ" or similar terms.

The phrase may also refer to a country's laws extending beyond its boundaries in the sense that they may authorise the courts of that country to enforce their jurisdiction against parties appearing before them in with respect to acts they allegedly engaged in outside that country. This does not depend on the co-operation of other countries, since the affected people are within the relevant country (or at least, in a case involving a person being tried in absentia, the case is being heard by a court of that country). For example, many countries have laws which give their criminal courts jurisdiction to try prosecutions for piracy, sexual offences against children, computer crimes and/or terrorism committed outside their national boundaries. Sometimes such laws only apply to nationals of that country, and sometimes they may apply to anyone.

== Terminology ==
Some confusion has arisen as to the meaning of "extraterritorial jurisdiction." Cedric Ryngaert, Professor of Public International Law and Head of the Department of International and European Law at Utrecht University, noted that a state asserting jurisdiction over crimes committed in other jurisdictions would still prosecute in the state's own territorial courts.

== Cases of exercised jurisdiction ==
=== Diplomatic missions ===
Diplomatic immunity of foreign embassies and consulates in host countries is governed by the Vienna Convention on Diplomatic Relations and the Vienna Convention on Consular Relations. They remain under the jurisdiction of the host country but are 'inviolable' (the host country's agents may not enter the premises, or detain accredited diplomats).

=== Military forces ===
Status of forces agreements and visiting forces agreements are in effect in many countries that allow visiting forces to exercise jurisdiction over members of their forces that are stationed in the host country.

=== Criminal law ===
Criminal jurisdiction can be of an extraterritorial nature where:

- a nation asserts it either generally or in specific cases under its domestic law,
- a supranational authority (such as the United Nations Security Council) has created an international court to deal with a specific case (e.g. war crimes in a certain country), or
- an international court has been created under a treaty to deal with a stated area of jurisdiction.

Criminal codes in certain countries assert jurisdiction over crimes committed outside the country:

- in France, the Code pénal asserts general jurisdiction over crimes by, or against, the country's citizens, no matter where they may have occurred; this is also the case with regard to those who became French citizens after the act. Double criminality is required except in the cases of felonies (crimes) which carry custodial sentences of ten years or more.
- in Japan, the Penal Code specifies certain cases and applicable lists of crimes over which jurisdiction will be asserted.

Many countries have implemented laws that allow their nationals to be prosecuted by their courts for crimes such as war crimes and genocide even when the crime is committed extraterritorially. In addition, the Rome Statute of the International Criminal Court has been incorporated into domestic law in many countries to provide for the International Criminal Court to exercise jurisdiction within their borders.

Beyond domestic criminal codes, international bodies also regulate state actions abroad. For example, the European Court of Human Rights handles state responsibility for overseas abuses under human rights treaties; in the 2026 case Malachini and Others v. Russia, the Court ruled that a state exercises extraterritorial jurisdiction over prisoners of war the moment they are captured, even during active military hostilities.

=== Sanctions against foreign countries ===
Economic sanctions against other countries may be instituted under either domestic law or under the authority of the United Nations Security Council, and their severity can include measures against foreign persons operating outside the country in question.

In 2017, German Chancellor Angela Merkel and European Union President Jean-Claude Juncker criticized the draft of new U.S. sanctions against Russia targeting the EU–Russia energy projects. France’s foreign ministry described the new U.S. sanctions as illegal under international law due to their extraterritorial reach.

=== Competition law ===
Extraterritorial jurisdiction plays a significant role in regulation of transnational anti-competitive practices. In the U.S., extraterritorial impacts in this field first arose from Standard Oil Co. of New Jersey v. United States, where Imperial Oil in Canada was ordered to be divested from Standard Oil. Current practice dates from United States v. Alcoa, where the effects doctrine was introduced, allowing for jurisdiction over foreign offenders and foreign conduct, so long as the economic effects of the anticompetitive conduct are experienced on the domestic market. The effects doctrine has been gradually developed in the U.S. and then in various forms accepted in other jurisdictions, also in the developing world. In the EU it is recognised based on the qualified effects or implementation test.

Extraterritorial jurisdiction in the area of antitrust faces various limitations, such as the problem of accessing foreign-based evidence, as well as the difficulties of challenged anticompetitive conduct arising from foreign state involvement.

== Application in specific countries ==
=== Commonwealth of Nations ===
The ability of parliaments of Commonwealth countries to legislate extraterritorially was confirmed by s. 3 of the Statute of Westminster 1931.

In Australia, extraterritorial jurisdiction of the state parliaments was authorized by s.2 of the Australia Act 1986.

=== Canada ===
The Criminal Code asserts jurisdiction over the following offences outside Canada:

- on a Canadian aircraft in flight, or on any other flight which terminates in Canada, for any indictable offence
- on any aircraft or in any airport in the world, for endangering such facilities
- by a Canadian citizen, permanent resident, or stateless person resident in Canada, for offences relating to cultural property protected by the Hague Convention for the Protection of Cultural Property in the Event of Armed Conflict
- against or on board a Canadian ship on the high seas or a fixed platform attached to the continental shelf of Canada, or by or against a Canadian citizen on any ship or fixed platform, or by any person who is found in Canada after such offence
- on a Canadian ship or aircraft, relating to
  - hostage taking,
  - offences against internationally protected persons or United Nations personnel, or
  - terrorism financing
- on the International Space Station
- involving nuclear material
- involving terrorism
- terrorist activity against Canadian citizens or Canadian government missions, or intended to compel the Canadian government, or any provincial government, to do or not do a particular act
- relating to sexual offences against children

=== China ===
Article 38 of the Hong Kong national security law, passed in June 2020, asserts that the law applies to all persons – regardless of nationality – both inside and outside Hong Kong.

Crimes covered under the national security law include:

- advocating, planning, or supporting secession or changes in Hong Kong or the People's Republic of China sovereignty.
- subverting the People's Republic of China government and system, including related participation, organizing, planning, and financially supporting these activities
- substantially interfering or obstructing the People's Republic of China and Hong Kong government functions
- acts of terrorism, defined as including damaging transportation equipment, causing traffic obstructions, or otherwise substantially interfering with the public's health and safety
- colluding with foreign forces to harm national security, defined as including causing substantial obstruction to the People's Republic of China and Hong Kong government policies, controlling elections, seeking foreign sanctions, or inciting hate against the Chinese and Hong Kong governments.

In 2024, the People's Republic of China issued legal guidelines stating that supporters of Taiwanese independence, regardless of their location, could be tried in absentia and sentenced to death by Chinese courts.

=== United Kingdom ===
Under Section 72 of the Sexual Offences Act 2003, British citizens can be prosecuted for sexual offences committed abroad if said act would constitute an offence in both jurisdictions (under the law in force in that country or territory, and the law applicable in the relevant UK nation). Section 72 was used to convict paedophile Richard Huckle on 71 counts of serious sexual offences against children in Malaysia. Huckle was sentenced to 22 life sentences. While no official tally is kept, seven people are believed to have been convicted under Section 72.

The Female Genital Mutilation Act 2003 asserted extraterritorial jurisdiction to close the loophole whereby girls could be taken outside the UK to undergo FGM procedures.

The Nuclear Explosions (Prohibition and Inspections) Act 1998 in Section 2 prohibits United Kingdom nationals, Scottish partnerships or bodies incorporated under the law of any part of the United Kingdom from knowingly causing a nuclear explosion in or outside the United Kingdom.

=== United States ===
==== Municipal and state law ====
In the U.S., many states have laws or even constitutional provisions which permit cities to make certain decisions about the land beyond the town's incorporated limits.

- Examples of states which allow cities to claim ETJ with respect to zoning or other matters, either generally or prior to annexation, are:

- Alaska
- Arkansas
- Nebraska,
- North Carolina, and
- Texas

- In California, county Local Agency Formation Commissions determine spheres of influence that cities may exercise over areas outside their boundaries.

==== Federal law ====
The U.S. Criminal Code asserts the following items to fall within the special maritime and territorial jurisdiction of the United States, much of which is extraterritorial in nature:

1. The high seas and any other waters within the admiralty and maritime jurisdiction of the United States and out of the jurisdiction of any particular state, including any vessels owned by US persons that are travelling on them
2. Any US vessel travelling on the Great Lakes, connecting waters or the Saint Lawrence River (where that river forms part of the Canada–United States border)
3. Any lands reserved or acquired for the use of the United States, and under the exclusive or concurrent jurisdiction thereof
4. Any island claimed under the Guano Islands Act
5. Any US aircraft flying over waters in the same manner as US vessels
6. Any US spacecraft when in flight
7. Any place outside the jurisdiction of any nation with respect to an offense by or against a national of the United States
8. Any foreign vessel during a voyage having a scheduled departure from or arrival in the United States with respect to an offense committed by or against a national of the United States
9. Offenses committed by or against a national of the United States in diplomatic missions, consulates, military and other missions, together with related residences, outside the US
10. International Parental Kidnapping Crime Act

Individuals involved in doping at major international sporting events can be sanctioned by the United States via the Rodchenkov Act if American companies are involved in sponsoring those events or the American financial system is utilized by the organizers.

In order to deal with the issue of private military contractors and private security contractors being used by U.S. Government agencies overseas, the Military Extraterritorial Jurisdiction Act was passed by Congress to subject them to a similar manner of jurisdiction.

Certain federal property has the status of federal enclave, restricting the application of state laws, but that has been partially rectified by the Assimilative Crimes Act. Similarly, state jurisdiction is restricted on Native American tribal lands.

Generally, the U.S. founding fathers and early courts believed that American laws could not have jurisdiction over sovereign countries. In a 1909 Supreme Court case, Justice Oliver Wendell Holmes introduced what came to be known as the "presumption against extraterritoriality," making explicit this judicial preference that U.S. laws not be applied to other countries. American thought about extraterritoriality has changed over the years, however. For example, the Alien Tort Statute of 1789 allows foreign citizens in the United States to bring cases before federal courts against foreign defendants for violations of the "law of nations" in foreign countries. Although this statute was ignored for many years, U.S. courts since the 1980s have interpreted it to allow foreigners to seek justice in cases of human-rights violations in foreign lands, such as in Sosa v. Alvarez-Machain. In Morrison v. National Australia Bank, 2010, the Supreme Court held that in interpreting a statute, the "presumption against extraterritoriality" is absolute unless the text of the statute explicitly says otherwise.

==== Economic law ====
Economic sanctions with extraterritorial impact have been instituted under:

- the Trading with the Enemy Act (as in the case of the embargo against Cuba)
- the Arms Export Control Act and International Traffic in Arms Regulations (in governing the re-export of subject goods and technologies after initial export from the US)
- the International Emergency Economic Powers Act (especially in the case of sanctions against Iran)
- the Countering America's Adversaries Through Sanctions Act

== See also ==
- Free-trade zone
- Extraterritoriality
- International child abduction
- Taxation of non resident Americans
- Foreign Account Tax Compliance Act (U.S. law)
- Nazis and Nazi Collaborators (Punishment) Law
- General Data Protection Regulation
