= List of cities in the Americas by population =

The following is a list of the 100 largest cities in the Americas by city proper population using the most recent official estimate.

== List ==
Italics represents capital city

Bold represents largest city in country

Rank	City	Country	Population	Population as of (Y-M-D)
1	**São Paulo**	Brazil	11,877,700	2024-07-01
2	**Lima**	Peru	11,166,200 (Note: Region of Lima, not including metropolitan area extending into neighbouring regions)	2022-06-30
3	**Mexico City**	Mexico	9,209,944 (Note: Mexico City Federal District)	2020-3-15
4	**New York**	United States	8,478,072	2024-07-01
5	**Bogotá**	Colombia	7,876,000	2023-06-30
6	Rio de Janeiro	Brazil	6,729,830	2024-07-01
7	**Santiago**	Chile	6,160,040	2017-04-19
8	Los Angeles	United States	3,878,704	2024-07-01
9	**Buenos Aires**	Argentina	3,121,707	2022-05-18
10	**Toronto**	Canada	3,025,647	2023
11	Brasília	Brazil	2,877,690	2024-07-01
12	Salvador	Brazil	2,871,560	2023
13	Chicago	United States	2,705,994	2023
14	Fortaleza	Brazil	2,669,340	2023
15	**Santo Domingo**	Dominican Republic	2,581,827	2023
16	Belo Horizonte	Brazil	2,512,070	2023
17	Medellín	Colombia	2,480,000	2023
18	Cali	Colombia	2,383,500	2023
19	Houston	United States	2,325,502	2023
20	**Guayaquil**	Ecuador	2,278,691	2023
21	Manaus	Brazil	2,171,700	2023
22	**Havana**	Cuba	2,131,480	2023
23	**Caracas**	Venezuela	2,089,012	2023
24	Curitiba	Brazil	1,933,110	2023
25	Ecatepec	Mexico	1,837,700	2023
26	Maracaibo	Venezuela	1,752,602 (Note: Excluding municipality of San Francisco: included in the metropolitan city of Maracaibo)	2023
27	Montreal	Canada	1,704,694 (Note: Ville (municipality) only)	2023
28	Phoenix	United States	1,660,272	2023
29	Recife	Brazil	1,645,730	2023
30	Quito	Ecuador	1,607,734	2023
31	Philadelphia	United States	1,584,138	2023
32	Puebla	Mexico	1,544,500	2023
33	Guadalajara	Mexico	1,539,900	2023
34	San Antonio	United States	1,532,233	2023
35	Goiânia	Brazil	1,510,380	2023
36	Porto Alegre	Brazil	1,483,770	2023
37	Belém	Brazil	1,479,970	2023
38	Ciudad Juárez	Mexico	1,460,200	2023
39	Córdoba	Argentina	1,446,201	2023
40	Tijuana	Mexico	1,445,100	2023
41	**Santa Cruz**	Bolivia	1,442,396	2023
42	San Diego	United States	1,425,976	2023
43	Guarulhos	Brazil	1,379,180	2023
44	Dallas	United States	1,345,047	2023
45	**Montevideo**	Uruguay	1,304,687	2023
46	León	Mexico	1,288,600	2023
47	Rosario	Argentina	1,284,166	2023
48	Zapopan	Mexico	1,251,300	2023
49	Calgary	Canada	1,239,220 (Note: Municipality only)	2023
50	Monterrey	Mexico	1,228,000	2023
51	Barranquilla	Colombia	1,224,000	2023
52	Nezahualcóyotl	Mexico	1,213,200	2023
53	Campinas	Brazil	1,183,370	2023
54	Barquisimeto	Venezuela	1,089,100	2023
55	São Gonçalo	Brazil	1,084,050	2023
56	**Tegucigalpa**	Honduras	1,079,400	2023
57	São Luís	Brazil	1,040,740	2023
58	**Managua**	Nicaragua	1,038,785	2023
59	San Jose	United States	1,030,119	2023
60	Maceió	Brazil	1,018,270	2023
61	Arequipa	Peru	1,002,846	2023
62	Naucalpan	Mexico	998,000	2023
63	Cartagena	Colombia	983,400	2023
64	Austin	United States	964,254	2023
65	Valencia	Venezuela	936,071 (Note: Municipality only - excluding Los Guayos, Naguanagua, San Diego and Tocuyito)	2023
66	Ottawa	Canada	934,243	2023
67	Chihuahua	Mexico	932,600	2023
68	Edmonton	Canada	932,546	2023
69	**Guatemala City**	Guatemala	923,392	2023
70	Duque de Caxias	Brazil	916,470	2023
71	Jacksonville	United States	903,889	2023
72	Fort Worth	United States	895,008	2023
73	Ciudad Guayana	Venezuela	893,400	2023
74	Columbus	United States	892,533	2023
75	Natal	Brazil	884,120	2023
76	Campo Grande	Brazil	883,960	2023
77	San Francisco	United States	883,305	2023
78	**Port-au-Prince**	Haiti	875,978	2023
79	Charlotte	United States	872,498	2023
80	Mérida	Mexico	872,300	2023
81	Indianapolis	United States	867,125	2023
82	Trujillo	Peru	857,063	2023
83	El Alto	Bolivia	846,880	2023
84	Hermosillo	Mexico	829,000	2023
85	Cancún	Mexico	827,500	2023
86	São Bernardo do Campo	Brazil	824,900	2023
87	Teresina	Brazil	866,400	2024
88	Nova Iguaçu	Brazil	812,160	2023
89	Saltillo	Mexico	811,500	2023
90	João Pessoa	Brazil	805,960	2023
91	Aguascalientes	Mexico	805,200	2023
92	Culiacán	Mexico	795,000	2023
93	San Luis Potosí	Mexico	793,300	2023
94	La Paz	Bolivia	758,845	2023
95	Mexicali	Mexico	757,200	2023
96	Chimalhuacán	Mexico	752,200	2023
97	Seattle	United States	744,955	2023
98	Guadalupe	Mexico	722,400	2023
99	Acapulco	Mexico	720,400	2023
100	Mississauga	Canada	717,961	2021

== See also ==
- List of metropolitan areas in the Americas
- List of United States cities by population
- List of the largest municipalities in Canada by population
- List of North American cities by population
