= List of largest cities =

The United Nations uses three definitions for what constitutes a city, as not all cities in all jurisdictions are classified using the same criteria. Cities may be defined as the cities proper, their metropolitan regions, or the extent of their urban area. A complicating factor is that many large cities in the world have not only homeless or the unhoused, but also vast slum communities. This leads to official census data being less accurate in representing the actual number of residents in a given area.

== Definitions ==
=== City proper (administrative unit) ===
The municipality of Chongqing, China, whose administrative jurisdictional area is approximately the size of Austria, has the largest population of any city proper; however around 30% of its residents live in rural areas.

A city can be defined by its administrative boundaries, otherwise known as city proper. UNICEF defines city proper as, "the population living within the administrative boundaries of a city or controlled directly from the city by a single authority." A city proper is a locality defined according to legal or political boundaries and an administratively recognised urban status that is usually characterised by some form of local government. Cities proper and their boundaries and population data may not include suburbs.

The use of city proper as defined by administrative boundaries may not include suburban areas where an important proportion of the population working or studying in the city lives. Because of this definition, the city proper population figure may differ greatly from the urban area population figure, as many cities are amalgamations of smaller municipalities, and conversely, many Chinese cities govern territories that extend well beyond the core urban area into suburban and rural areas. The Chinese municipality of Chongqing, which is the largest city proper in the world by population, comprises a huge administrative area of 82,403 km^{2}, around the size of Austria. However, around 30% of its 30-million population are agricultural workers living in a rural setting.

=== Metropolitan area ===
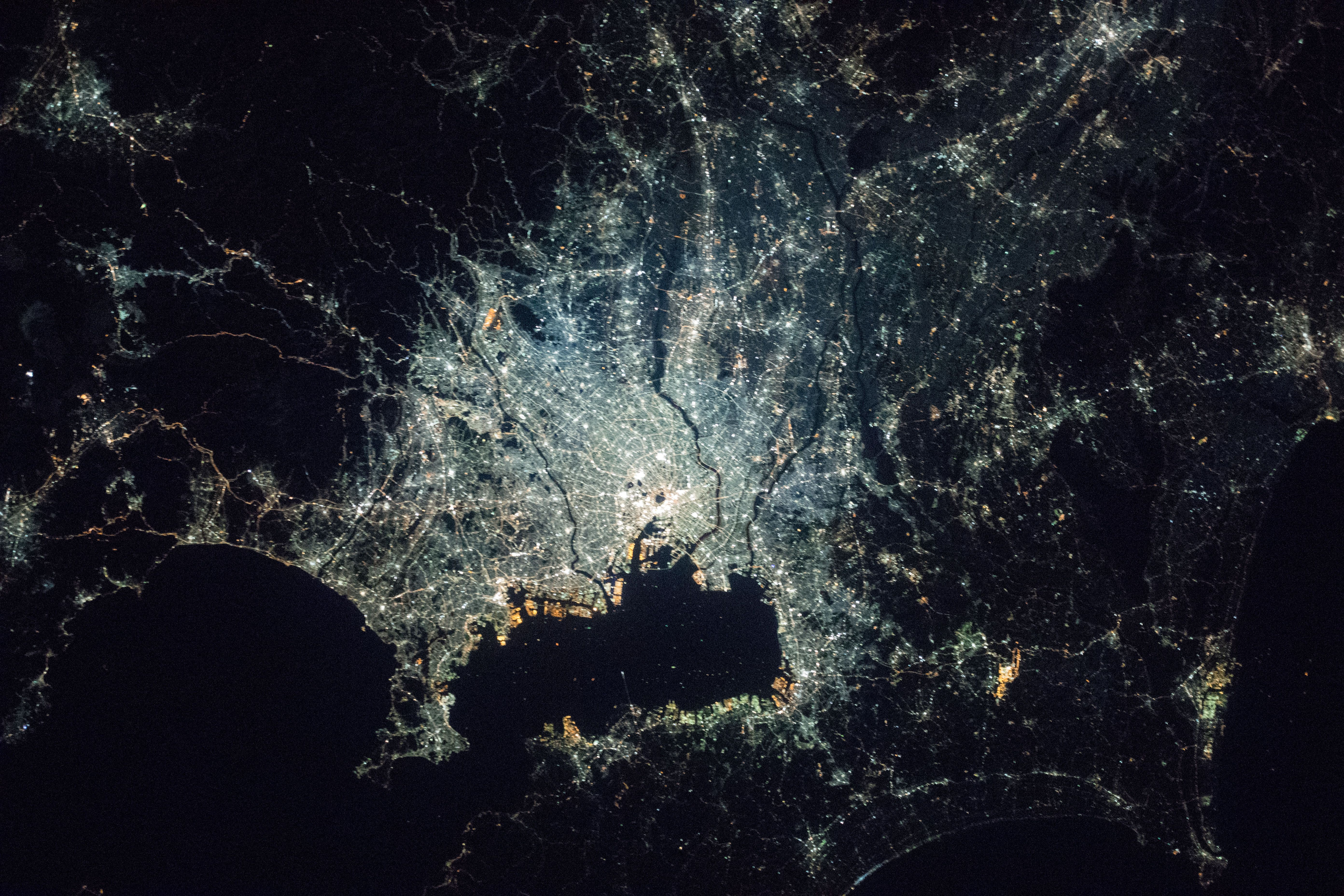
Tokyo, the world's third-largest city by metropolitan population.

A city can be defined by the inhabitants of its demographic population, as by metropolitan area, or labour market area. UNICEF defines metropolitan area as follows:

A formal local government area comprising the urban area as a whole and its primary commuter areas, typically formed around a city with a large concentration of people (i.e., a population of at least 100,000). In addition to the city proper, a metropolitan area includes both the surrounding territory with urban levels of residential density and some additional lower-density areas that are adjacent to and linked to the city (e.g., through frequent transport, road linkages or commuting facilities).

In many countries, metropolitan areas are established either as a local administrative organisation or only for statistical purposes. In the United States, metropolitan statistical area (MSA) is defined by the U.S. Office of Management and Budget (OMB). In the Philippines, metropolitan areas have an official agency, such as Metropolitan Manila Development Authority (MMDA), which manages Manila metropolitan area. Similar agencies exist in Indonesia, such as Jabodetabekjur Development Cooperation Agency for Jakarta metropolitan area.

=== Urban area ===
A city can be defined as a conditionally contiguous urban area, with relatively less regard to territorial or administrative boundaries. UNICEF defines urban area as follows:

The definition of "urban" varies from country to country, and, with periodic reclassification, can also vary within one country over time, making direct comparisons difficult. An urban area can be defined by one or more of the following: administrative criteria or political boundaries (e.g., area within the jurisdiction of a municipality or town committee), a threshold population size (where the minimum for an urban settlement is typically in the region of 2,000 people, although this varies globally between 200 and 50,000), population density, economic function (e.g., where a significant majority of the population is not primarily engaged in agriculture, or where there is surplus employment) or the presence of urban characteristics (e.g., paved streets, electric lighting, sewerage).

According to Demographia, an urban area is a continuously built up land mass of urban development that is within a labor market (metropolitan area or metropolitan region) and contains no rural land.

== List ==
There are 85 cities in the world with a population exceeding 5 million people, according to 2025 estimates by the United Nations.

City (Note: For urban/metropolitan areas that have more than one core city, the figure for their city proper should use either the most populous one (e.g. Dallas for Dallas–Fort Worth metroplex) or the best-known one (e.g. Manila for Metro Manila, instead of Quezon City).)	Country	UN 2025	City proper (Note: Figures taken from official census when possible)				Urban area			Metropolitan area (Note: Figures taken from official census when possible)		
City	Country	Population	Definition	Population	Area (km^{2})	Density (/km^{2})	Population	Area (km^{2})	Density (/km^{2})	Population	Area (km^{2})	Density (/km^{2})
Jakarta	Indonesia	41,913,860	Special region	10,154,134	664	15,292	33,756,000	3,546	9,519 (Note: Includes Tangerang, South Tangerang, Bogor, Bekasi and Karawang.)	33,430,285	7,063	4,733
Dhaka	Bangladesh	36,585,479	Capital city	10,295,407	338	30,460	19,134,000	619	30,911	36,585,479	2,570	14,236
Tokyo	Japan	33,412,512	Metropolis prefecture	13,515,271	2,191	6,169	37,785,000	8,231	4,591 (Note: Includes large areas Tokyo, Kanagawa, Chiba and Saitama prefectures and smaller areas of Gunma, Tochigi and Ibaraki prefectures.)	37,274,000	13,452	2,771
Delhi	India	30,222,405	National Capital Territory	16,753,235	1,484	11,289	32,226,000	2,344	13,748 (Note: Includes Faridabad, Ghaziabad, Noida, Gurgaon and Bahadurgarh urban areas and New Delhi.)	29,000,000	3,483	8,326
Shanghai	China	29,558,908	Municipality	24,870,895	6,341	3,922	24,073,000	4,333	5,556 (Note: Includes Taicang)	31,050,000	14,923	2,081
Guangzhou	China	27,563,372	City (sub-provincial)	18,676,605	7,434	2,512	26,940,000	4,535	5,940 (Note: Includes the city of Foshan.)	32,623,413	4,194	7,778
Cairo	Egypt	25,566,102	Urban governorate	10,044,894	3,085	3,256	20,296,000	2,010	10,098	22,183,000	2,734	8,114
Manila	Philippines	24,735,305	National Capital Region	15,531,900	636	24,421	24,922,000	1,911	13,041 (Note: The continuous urbanization of Manila extends outward its Metro Manila into other neighbouring provinces such as Bulacan, Cavite, Laguna, Rizal, Pampanga and Batangas provinces.)	30,785,176	7,967	3,864
Kolkata	India	22,549,738	Municipal corporation	4,496,694	206	21,829	21,747,000	1,352	16,085	15,333,000	1,887	8,126
Seoul	South Korea	22,490,482	Special city	10,013,781	605	16,552	23,016,000	2,769	8,312	25,514,000	11,704	2,180
Karachi	Pakistan	21,422,590	Metropolitan city	15,738,000	591	26,629	20,249,000	1,124	18,015	20,249,000	1,124	18,015
Mumbai	India	20,203,056	Municipal corporation	12,478,447	603	20,694	24,973,000	976	25,587 (Note: Includes Kalyan and urban areas of Panvel, Bhiwandi and Vasai-Virar.)	23,598,000	6,328	3,729
São Paulo	Brazil	18,949,790	Municipality	12,252,023	1,521	8,055	23,086,000	3,649	6,327 (Note: Includes Francisco Morato)	21,734,682	7,947	2,735
Bangkok	Thailand	18,180,280	Special administrative area	8,305,218	1,569	5,293	18,007,000	3,199	5,629	16,255,900	7,762	2,094
Mexico City	Mexico	17,734,212	City-state	9,209,944	1,485	6,202	21,804,000	2,530	8,618	21,804,515	7,866	2,772
Beijing	China	17,013,303	Municipality	21,893,095	16,411	1,334	18,522,000	4,284	4,324	22,366,547	1,334	16,765
Lahore	Pakistan	15,156,430	Metropolitan city	13,004,135	1,772	7,339	12,306,000	945	13,022	13,004,135	1,772	7,339
Istanbul	Turkey	15,014,763	Metropolitan municipality	15,519,267	5,196	2,987	14,441,000	1,471	9,817	15,701,602	5,343	2,939
Moscow	Russia	14,524,753	Federal city	13,200,000	2,511	5,257	17,332,000	6,154	2,816	20,004,462	—N/a	—N/a
Ho Chi Minh City	Vietnam	14,052,713	Municipality	7,431,000	2,061	3,606	15,136,000	2,165	6,991	21,281,639	30,595	696
Buenos Aires	Argentina	14,017,736	Autonomous city	3,054,300	203	15,046	16,710,000	3,437	4,862	16,710,000	3,437	4,862
New York City	United States	13,920,148	City	8,804,190	778	11,316	21,509,000	13,318	1,615 (Note: Includes Bridgeport, New Haven, Trenton, Danbury, Waterbury and Twin Rivers urban areas.)	23,143,097	12,093	1,665
Shenzhen	China	13,878,396	City (sub-provincial)	17,494,398	2,050	8,534	17,619,000	1,803	9,772	—N/a	—N/a	—N/a
Bengaluru	India	13,187,098	Municipal corporation	8,443,675	709	11,909	8,443,675	741	11,395	10,456,000	8,005	1,306
Osaka	Japan	12,964,145	Designated city	2,725,006	225	12,111	15,126,000	3,020	5,009 (Note: Includes major cities of Kobe and Kyoto, collectively also known as Keihanshin area.)	19,303,000	13,228	1,459
Lagos	Nigeria	12,791,699	Metropolitan city	—N/a	—N/a	—N/a	16,637,000	1,966	8,462	21,000,000	1,171	17,933
Los Angeles	United States	12,740,420	City	3,990,456	1,214	3,287	15,204,000	6,351	2,394	18,372,485	12,559	1,058
Chennai	India	11,153,205	Municipal corporation	6,727,000	426	15,791	12,395,000	1,085	11,424	11,564,000	2,280	5,072
Kinshasa	(Democratic Republic of the Congo) DR Congo	10,943,641	City-province	17,071,000	9,965	1,713	12,836,000	474	27,080	17,778,500	9,965	1,784
Bogotá	Colombia	10,624,315	Capital District	7,963,000	1,587	5,018	10,085,000	562	17,945	12,545,272	5,934	2,114
Lima	Peru	10,580,241	Metropolitan municipality	8,894,000	2,672	3,329	10,320,000	891	11,582	9,569,468	2,819	3,395
London	United Kingdom	10,416,420	Administrative area (Note: Greater London is defined by the London Government Act 1963 as an "administrative area", and administered since 2000 by the Greater London Authority. Greater London is coterminous with the London region (a non-administrative area) and divided into the City of London and 32 London boroughs, each a separate local government area. See subdivisions of England.)	8,825,001	1,572	5,614	11,262,000	1,738	6,480	14,372,596	8,382	1,715
Rio de Janeiro	Brazil	9,500,336	Municipality	6,520,000	1,221	5,340	12,592,000	2,020	6,234	12,644,321	5,327	2,374
Paris	France	9,381,921	Commune	2,148,271	105	20,460	11,060,000	2,853	3,877	12,244,807	18,941	646
Hyderabad	India	9,190,795	Municipal corporation	6,993,262	650	10,759	10,494,000	1,404	7,474	10,494,000	7,257	1,446
Tehran	Iran	9,174,964	Capital city	9,033,003	751	12,028	14,148,000	1,704	8,303	14,557,000	2,235	6,513
Taipei	Taiwan	9,137,000	Special municipality	2,594,581	272	9,539	9,866,000	1,090	9,051	7,034,084	2,457	2,863
Luanda	Angola	9,051,000	Municipality	2,165,867	116	18,671	9,051,000	1,005	9,006	11,370,000	1,876	6,061
Bandung	Indonesia	8,909,104	City	2,528,160	167	15,176	7,203,000	487	14,791	9,143,808	3,458	2,644
Kuala Lumpur	Malaysia	8,443,731	Capital city (Federal territory)	1,768,000	243	7,276	8,911,000	2,163	4,120	7,200,000	2,793	2,578
Dar es Salaam	Tanzania	7,795,114	City	5,383,728	1,393	3,865	7,962,000	961	8,285	10,599,999	1,599	6,629
Suzhou	China	7,731,101	Prefecture-level city	12,748,262	8,488	1,502	6,031,000	1,386	4,351	12,748,252	12,493	1,020
Ahmedabad	India	7,632,408	Municipal corporation	5,570,585	464	12,006	8,009,000	404	19,824	6,300,000	—N/a	—N/a
Hangzhou	China	7,500,208	City (sub-provincial)	11,936,010	16,596	719	9,523,000	1,344	7,086	13,035,329	16,821	775
Wuhan	China	7,363,548	City (sub-provincial)	12,447,718	8,494	1,465	12,447,718	1,722	7,229	13,739,000	8,494	1,617
Tianjin	China	7,285,342	Municipality	13,866,009	11,920	1,163	10,368,000	2,813	3,686	—N/a	—N/a	—N/a
Alexandria	Egypt	7,266,957	Urban governorate	5,441,866	2,300	2,366	4,712,000	293	16,082	—N/a	—N/a	—N/a
Nagoya	Japan	7,146,160	Designated city	2,320,361	326	7,118	9,197,000	3,704	2,483	9,363,000	7,271	1,288
Johannesburg	South Africa	7,077,175	Metropolitan municipality	4,803,262	1,643	2,924	14,586,000	4,040	3,610 (Note: Includes Pretoria)	—N/a	—N/a	—N/a
Chongqing	China	7,071,073	Municipality	32,054,159	82,403	389	12,135,000	1,580	7,680	32,054,159	82,403	389
Riyadh	Saudi Arabia	6,916,417	Municipality	6,694,000	1,913	3,499	7,237,000	1,673	4,326	—N/a	—N/a	—N/a
Surat	India	6,908,925	Municipal corporation	4,466,826	327	13,660	6,538,000	238	27,471	—N/a	—N/a	—N/a
Surabaya	Indonesia	6,843,503	City	3,018,022	336	8,984	6,556,000	912	7,189	10,081,343	6,309	1,598
Pune	India	6,817,951	Municipal corporation	3,124,458	485	6,447	8,231,000	650	12,663	7,276,000	7,256	1,003
Khartoum	Sudan	6,809,355	—N/a	1,410,858	—N/a	—N/a	7,869,000	1,031	7,632	—N/a	—N/a	—N/a
Nanjing	China	6,800,676	City (sub-provincial)	9,314,685	6,582	1,415	8,422,000	1,614	5,218	—N/a	—N/a	—N/a
Santiago	Chile	6,726,045	City (commune)	236,453	22	10,748	7,171,000	1,147	6,252	7,112,808	15,403	462
Chicago	United States	8,864,000	City	2,746,388	589	4,663	9,057,000	7,006	1,293	9,806,184	18,640	516
Chengdu	China	8,813,000	City (sub-provincial)	20,937,757	14,378	1,456	20,937,757	1,935	10,821	20,937,757	14,378	1,456
Xi'an	China	7,444,000	City (sub-provincial)	12,183,280	10,135	1,202	12,328,000	1,826	6,751	12,328,000	10,762	1,146
Hong Kong	Hong Kong SAR	7,429,000	City	7,298,600	1,104	6,611	7,450,000	290	25,690	—N/a	—N/a	—N/a
Dongguan	China	7,360,000	Prefecture-level city	10,466,625	2,465	4,246	10,646,000	1,759	6,052	—N/a	—N/a	—N/a
Foshan	China	7,236,000	Prefecture-level city	9,498,863	3,848	2,469	—N/a (Note: Included in Guangzhou)	—N/a	—N/a	—N/a	—N/a	—N/a
Shenyang	China	6,921,000	City (sub-provincial)	8,294,000	12,980	639	7,964,000	1,551	5,135 (Note: Includes the city of Fushun.)	8,294,000	12,980	639
Baghdad	Iraq	6,812,000	Urban governorate	8,126,755	5,200	1,563	6,183,000	694	8,909	8,141,000	12,869	633
Addis Ababa	Ethiopia	6,706,000	Capital city	3,859,999	527	7,324	7,922,000	673	11,771	5,956,680	810	7,354
Madrid	Spain	6,497,000	Municipality	3,266,126	606	5,390	6,211,000	1,365	4,550	6,641,649	—N/a	—N/a
Harbin	China	6,115,000	City (sub-provincial)	10,635,971	53,068	200	3,830,000	671	5,708	10,009,854	53,068	189
Houston	United States	6,115,000	City	2,325,502	1,553	1,497	6,500,000	4,931	1,318	7,765,149	21,395	363
Dallas	United States	6,099,000	City	1,345,047	882	1,525	6,950,000	5,278	1,317 (Note: Includes the city of Fort Worth, collectively known as Dallas–Fort Worth metroplex.)	9,021,108	22,463	402
Toronto	Canada	6,082,000	City	2,731,571	630	4,336	6,771,000	2,344	2,889	5,928,040	5,906	1,004
Miami	United States	6,036,000	City	470,914	93	5,069	6,058,000	3,313	1,829	6,158,824	15,890	388
Belo Horizonte	Brazil	5,972,000	City	2,502,557	331	7,563	5,328,000	1,287	4,140	5,156,217	9,459	545
Singapore	Singapore	5,792,000	Country	5,638,700	726	7,770	5,983,000	523	11,440	—N/a	—N/a	—N/a
Philadelphia	United States	5,695,000	Consolidated city-county	1,526,006	370	4,129	5,799,000	5,429	1,068	7,381,187	—N/a	—N/a
Atlanta	United States	5,572,000	City	498,715	354	1,408	5,478,000	7,400	740	6,976,171	21,690	322
Fukuoka	Japan	5,551,000	Designated city	1,588,924	343	4,627	2,286,000	505	4,527	—N/a	—N/a	—N/a
Barcelona	Spain	5,494,000	Municipality	1,620,343	101	15,980	4,800,000	1,072	4,478	5,474,482	—N/a	—N/a
Saint Petersburg	Russia	5,383,000	Federal city	5,601,911	1,400	4,001	5,445,000	1,510	3,606	—N/a	—N/a	—N/a
Qingdao	China	5,381,000	City (sub-provincial)	10,071,722	11,229	897	6,229,000	1,759	3,541	—N/a	—N/a	—N/a
Dalian	China	5,300,000	City (sub-provincial)	7,450,785	13,742	542	4,135,000	1,044	3,961	—N/a	—N/a	—N/a
Washington, D.C.	United States	5,207,000	Federal district	702,455	177	3,969	7,631,000	5,501	1,387 (Note: Includes the city of Baltimore.)	10,237,545	17,009	602
Yangon	Myanmar	5,157,000	City	4,728,524	—N/a	—N/a	6,874,000	666	10,321	—N/a	—N/a	—N/a
Jinan	China	5,052,000	City (sub-provincial)	9,202,432	10,244	898	4,017,000	932	4,310	—N/a	—N/a	—N/a
Guadalajara	Mexico	5,023,000	Municipality	1,385,621	151	9,176	5,525,000	816	6,771	5,286,642	3,560	1,485

== See also ==
- Historical urban community sizes
- List of largest cities throughout history
- List of cities with over 1 million inhabitants
- List of towns and cities with 100,000 or more inhabitants
