= Municipal Corporation (Pakistan) =

Pakistani municipal authority

The Municipal Corporation (MC) (Urdu: بلدیہ عظمی) is a municipal authority established under the local governments in Pakistan. According to Local Governments Act of Punjab, Sindh, Khyber-Pakhtunkhwa, Balochistan, Gilgit-Baltistan, and Azad Jammu and Kashmir, the Metropolitan Corporation is a corporate entity with perpetual succession, a seal, and the authority to purchase, keep, and engage into any contract as well as to bring and receive legal actions.

There are many Municipal Corporations in Pakistan and the Mayor is the head of each Municipal Corporation.

== Functions ==
Municipal Corporation's duties include:

- Approving spatial plans, master plans, zoning, land use plans, including land classification and reclassification, Environmental Control, urban design, urban renewal, and ecological balances.
- Enact laws and bye-laws governing public utilities, infrastructure, roads, markets, zoning, land use, housing, and the environment.
- Accept plans for mass transit and public transportation, as well as the building of inter-town routes, expressways, bridges, and underpasses.
- Preserve cultural and historical resources.
- Work on the city's landscaping, monuments, and embellishment.
- Approving fees and taxes.
- Relief for the poor, those in need, children, widows, orphans, and those with disabilities.
- Regulate markets and services, award licenses, permits, and permissions, and, when appropriate, apply fines for violations.
- Planning, engineering, and control of the movement of people and goods through the use oftraffic signals, road signs, street markings, parking spaces, and transport hubs, stops, stands, and terminals.

== Federal Capital Territory ==
Town Corporations

S. No	Corporation Name	City	Mayor/Administrator	Party	Ref
1	Town Corporations, Islamabad	Islamabad	Vacant		

== List of Municipal Corporations in Punjab ==
Metropolitan Corporation

S. No	City	Corporation Name	Mayor/Administrator	Party	Ref
1	Lahore	Metropolitan Corporation, Lahore	Vacant		

Municipal Corporations

S. No	City	Corporation Name	Mayor/Administrator	Party	Ref
1	Faisalabad	Municipal Corporation, Faisalabad	Vacant		
2	Gujranwala	Municipal Corporation, Gujranwala	Vacant		
3	Sialkot	Municipal Corporation, Sialkot	Vacant		
4	Gujrat	Municipal Corporation, Gujrat	Vacant		
5	Sargodha	Municipal Corporation, Sargodha	Vacant		
6	Sahiwal	Municipal Corporation, Sahiwal	Vacant		
7	Multan	Municipal Corporation, Multan	Vacant		
8	Dera Ghazi Khan	Municipal Corporation, D.G. Khan	Vacant		
9	Bahawalpur	Municipal Corporation, Bahawalpur	Vacant		
10	Rawalpindi	Municipal Corporation, Rawalpindi	Vacant		
11	Murree	Municipal Corporation, Murree	Vacant		

== List of Municipal Corporations in Sindh ==
Metropolitan Corporation

S. No	City	Corporation Name	Mayor/Administrator	Party	Ref
1	Karachi	Karachi Metropolitan Corporation	Murtaza Wahab	PPP	

Municipal Corporations

There are total 10 municipal corporations in Sindh. Seven of them fall under the Karachi Metropolitan Area, while the remaining 3 municipal corporations are listed below.

S. No	City	Corporation Name	Mayor/Administrator	Party	Ref
1	Hyderabad	Hyderabad Municipal Corporation	Vacant		
2	Sukkur	Sukkur Municipal Corporation	Vacant		
3	Larkana	Larkana Municipal Corporation	Vacant		

== List of Municipal Corporations in Balochistan ==
Metropolitan Corporation

S. No	City	Corporation Name	Mayor/Administrator	Party	Ref
1	Quetta	Metropolitan Corporation Quetta	Vacant		

Municipal Corporations

S. No	City	Population City Proper (2023 Census)	Corporation Name	Mayor/Administrator	Party	Ref
1	Hub	195,661	Hub Municipal Corporation	Vacant		
2	Chaman	130,139	Chaman Municipal Corporation	Vacant		
3	Turbat	268,625	Turbat Municipal Corporation	Vacant		
4	Khuzdar	218,112	Khuzdar Municipal Corporation	Vacant		
5	Dera Allah Yar	98,761	Dera Allah Yar Municipal Corporation	Vacant		
6	Pishin	107,646	Pishin Municipal Corporation	Vacant		
7	Panjgur	157,693	Chitkan Municipal Corporation	Vacant		
8	Usta Muhammad	64,632	Usta Muhammad Municipal Corporation	Vacant		
