= Leuven Centre for Global Governance Studies =

Research center at KU Leuven, Belgium

The Leuven Centre for Global Governance Studies is an interfaculty interdisciplinary research centre of the Humanities and Social Sciences at KU Leuven, Belgium. It carries out and supports interdisciplinary research on topics related to globalization, global governance processes and multilateralism, and has been recognized as a KU Leuven Centre of Excellence.

== History and Research ==
The Leuven Centre for Global Governance Studies carries out and supports interdisciplinary research on topics related to globalization, global governance processes and multilateralism, with a particular focus on the following areas, taking the many cross-cutting issues into account: (i) the European Union and global governance, (ii) human rights, democracy and rule of law, (iii) trade and sustainable development, (iv) peace and security, (v) emerging powers, (vi) federalism and multi-level governance, (vii) global commons and outer space, and (viii) non-state actors.

In full recognition of the complex issues involved, the Centre approaches global governance from a multilevel and multi-actor perspective. The Centre considers non-European perspectives to global governance of great importance. It also hosts the InBev-Baillet Latour EU-China Chair, which engages in interdisciplinary research and education on EU-China relations in close synergy with the InBev-Baillet Latour EU-China Chair at the Université catholique de Louvain, and the Leuven India Focus, which aims at developing knowledge and expertise on India and South Asia by organizing conferences, lectures and seminars and interdisciplinary research. The Centre regularly organizes transatlantic conferences and events focusing on Latin America and Asia, and takes a keen interest in the Global South.

In addition to its fundamental research, the Centre carries out independent applied research and advises policy-makers on multilateral governance and global public policy issues. It works with academic and policy partners from all over the world, including the European Parliament, European Commission, European External Action Service, Committee of the Regions, International Labour Organization (ILO), Organisation for Economic Co-operation and Development (OECD), United Nations Industrial Development Organization (UNIDO), United Nations Conference on Trade and Development (UNCTAD), World Bank and World Trade Organization (WTO). The Centre publishes the Leuven Global Governance Series with Edward Elgar Publishers, makes it research available through academic journal articles, working papers, policy briefs and global governance opinions on its web site and regularly publishes a newsletter.

Since March 2011, the Centre is located in the historical house de Dorlodot near the Centre of Leuven. The house is named after Henry de Dorlodot, a Belgian theologian and paleontologist (1855–1929).

== Events ==
The Leuven Centre for Global Governance Studies organizes many public events, such as conferences, workshops, lectures and seminars. A complete overview of all upcoming and past events can be found online.
