= City proper =

Geographical area contained within the defined boundary of a city

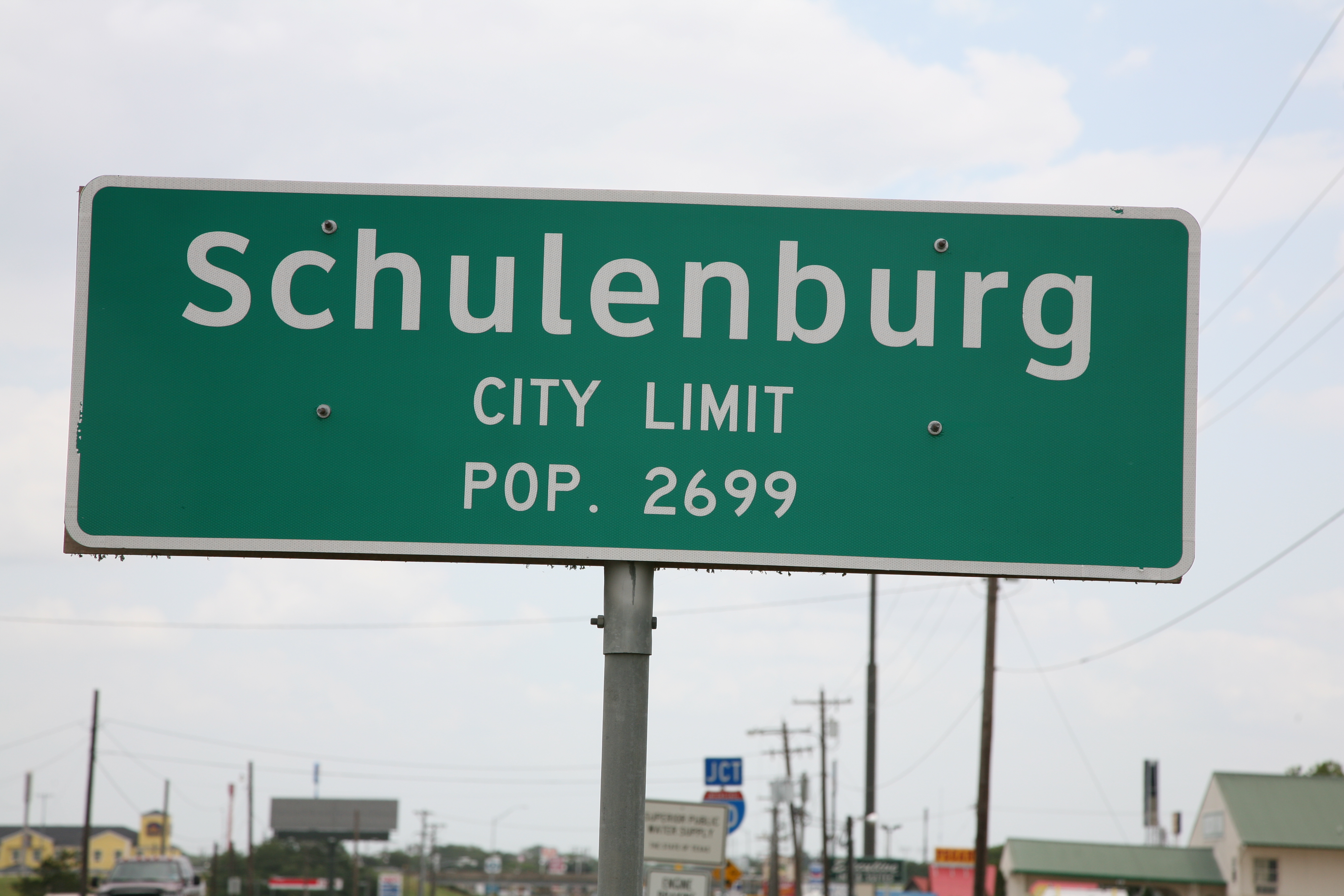
The city proper starts and ends at the city limits, as seen with this sign for Schulenburg, Texas.

A city proper is the geographical area contained within city limits. The term proper is not exclusive to cities; it can describe the geographical area within the boundaries of any given locality. The United Nations defines the term as "... the single political jurisdiction which contains the historical city centre."

City proper is one of the three basic concepts used to define urban areas and populations. The other two are urban agglomeration, and the metropolitan area. In some countries, city limits that act as the demarcation for the city proper are drawn very widely, while in others they are drawn very narrowly. This can cause substantial confusion when the legal boundaries of a city do not align with what most people intuitively think of as part of a city. For example, Miami proper has a population of 442,000 people—less than Fresno, California—but the wider Miami metropolitan area is the sixth-largest metropolitan area in the United States, including more than 6.1 million people.

== Usage ==
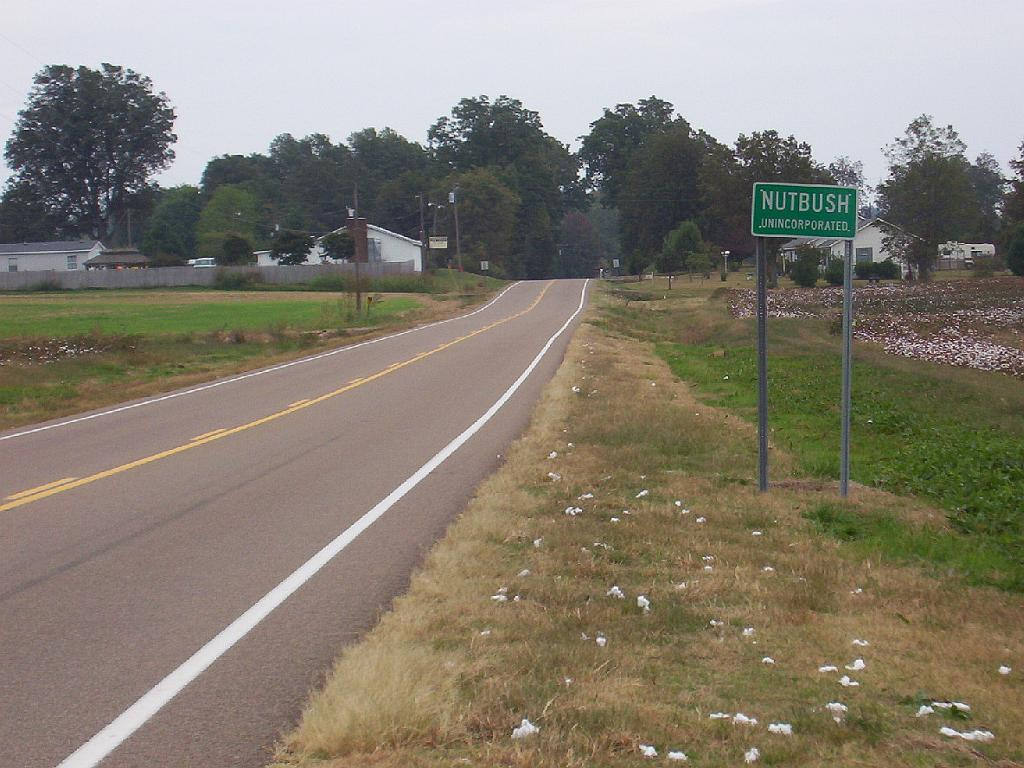
An unincorporated town such as Nutbush could not be a city proper, but it can be part of one.

In its strict sense, city proper is used as a technical term in demography, the statistical study of human populations. Under the title "World Urbanization Prospects", the United Nations issues every two years estimates and projections of the urban and rural populations of all countries of the world. The book defines the population of a city proper as "the population living within the administrative boundaries of a city." The book continues to say that "city proper as defined by administrative boundaries may not include suburban areas where an important proportion of the population working or studying in the city lives."

In demography, city proper is one of the three basic concepts used to define urban areas and populations.

In demography, city proper is one of the three basic concepts used to define urban areas and populations. The other two are urban agglomeration, and the metropolitan area. In addition, there are Census Statistical Areas and permutations thereof.

A United Nations University working paper titled "Urban Settlement" reviews the most commonly used data sources, and highlights the difficulties inherent in defining and measuring the size of urban versus rural populations. It says: "The city proper is determined by legal and administrative criteria, and typically comprises only those geographical areas that are part of a legally defined, and often historically-established administrative unit. However, many urban areas have grown far beyond the limits of the city proper, necessitating other measures. An urban agglomeration is the de facto population contained within the contours of a contiguous territory inhabited at urban density levels without regard to administrative boundaries’. Urban agglomerations are thus determined by density: the agglomeration ends where the density of settlement drops below some critical threshold. A still more comprehensive concept is the metropolitan area."

In short, there is no "right" manner to define a city or municipality; city proper is just one manner.

== Etymology ==
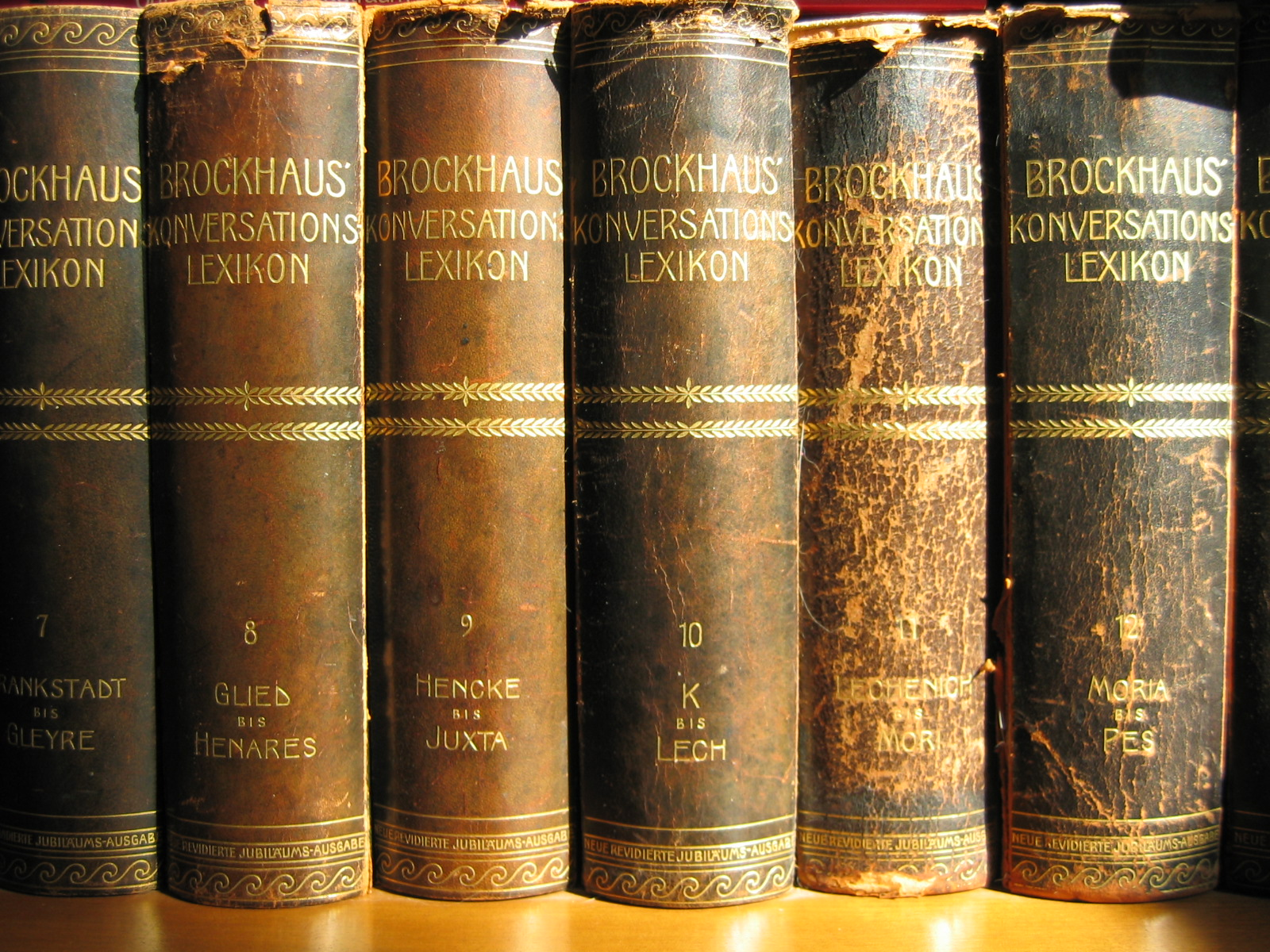
In encyclopedias, the term "city proper" is often used as an example to illustrate a meaning of the word "proper" as "tightly defined".

The term is a combination of "city" in the sense of "an incorporated administrative district", and "proper" in the sense of "strictly limited to a specified thing, place, or idea" or "strictly accurate". In encyclopedias, the term "city proper" is often used as an example to illustrate the meaning of the word "proper" in the sense of "tightly defined".

Encarta
"narrowly identified, strictly identified and distinguished from something else" – stayed in the suburbs, not the city proper
Merriam-Webster
"strictly limited to a specified thing, place, or idea 'the city proper;"
Dictionary.com
"in the strict sense of the word (usually used postpositively)":- Is the school within Boston proper or in the suburbs?
The Free Dictionary
"Being within the strictly limited sense, as of a term designating something: the town proper, excluding the suburbs".

== Internationalization ==
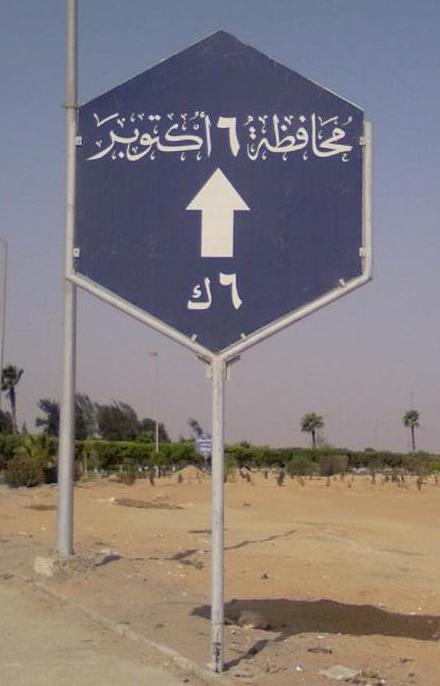
"City proper" can take on different meanings in different parts of the world. (6th of October, Egypt).

Especially when translated from the English or back, "city proper" sometimes takes on different meanings in different parts of the world. Some languages have no equivalent.

The United Nations Demographic Yearbook is compiled using questionnaires dispatched annually to more than 230 national statistical offices. These questionnaires ask for the country-specific definition of urban areas, rural areas and city proper. In its glossary, the Yearbook defines "city proper" as "a locality defined according to legal/political boundaries and an administratively recognized urban status that is usually characterized by some form of local government". In its data however, the United Nations Demographic Yearbook affords the individual countries considerable leeway over the definition of "city proper". The table titled "Population of capital cities and cities of 100 000 or more inhabitants" provides several country-specific definitions for "city proper" that diverge from the provided definition:

Japan
"Except for Tokyo, all data refer to shi, a minor division which may include some scattered or rural population as well as an urban centre". In Tokyo, "data for city proper refer to 23 wards (ku) of the old city".
Australia
"For all regions it is not possible to distinguish between 'city proper' and 'urban agglomeration' areas, therefore data has been included under 'city proper'".
UK, Thailand, Qatar, Cyprus, Bangladesh, Suriname, Colombia, Nicaragua, Canada
do not report City Proper data; agglomerations only.
Turkey
provides city proper data for most cities; for some large cities, such as Istanbul or Ankara, only agglomeration data are given.
Mexico
provides city proper data for most cities, while for others, such as Guadalajara, Mexico City, or Monterey, only agglomeration data are given.
Poland
A city can be "an administratively separated area entitled to civil (municipal) rights".
France
"Data for cities proper refer to communes which are centres for urban agglomeration".

These definitions are those given for the purpose of the United Nations Demographic Yearbook. One should not assume that these necessarily are the prevailing definitions in their respective countries.

== Controversy ==
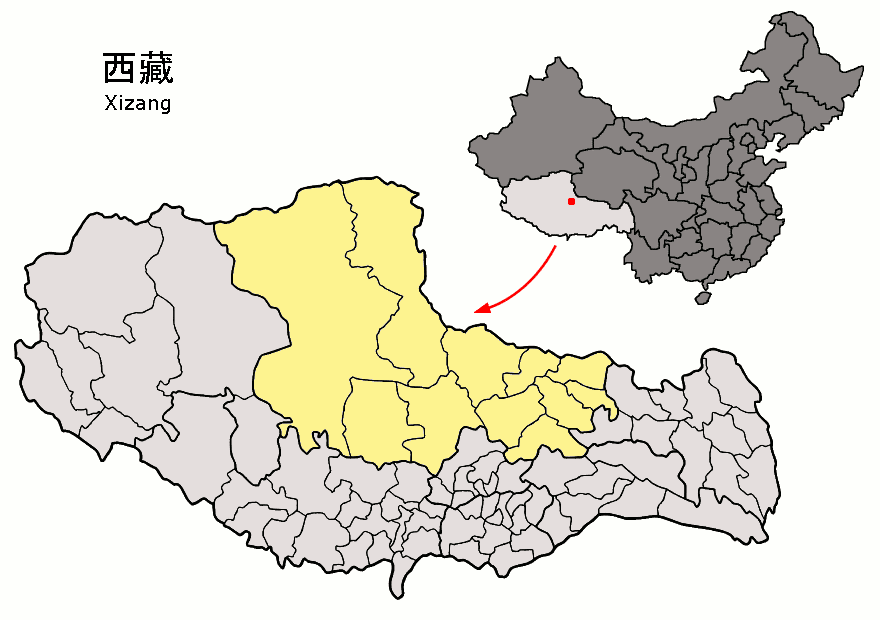
Nagqu (yellow), Tibet, a city established in 2018, became the largest city in China by area, overtaking Hulunbuir, Inner Mongolia.

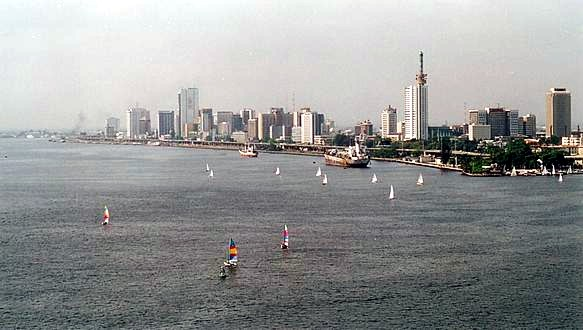
Divided into several Local Government Areas, Lagos, the most populous city in Africa, and one of the most populous and fastest growing cities in the world, does not count as a city proper.

In some countries, city limits that act as the demarcation for the city proper are drawn very wide, or very narrow. This can be a recurring cause for controversy.

"List of largest cities by area" lists several little known cities that are larger than many countries. By area, the city of Altamira, Brazil (population 84,000) is bigger than Greece. The City of Kalgoorlie-Boulder (population 32,000) covers more area than Hungary, Portugal, Austria, or Ireland. While these examples cause limited debate, cities in China are a source of continuing contention.

The Chinese city of Hulunbuir in Inner Mongolia was recognized as the largest city in the world by area until 2018 (see image caption above). According to the "Urban Settlement" working paper, in 1986, to cope with growing administrative demands at the local level, China essentially reclassified counties as cities in order to allow local city governments to control the surrounding areas". The authors state that "the Chinese city of Chongqing is another case in point. Even though the municipal district of Chongqing has a total population of more than 30 million inhabitants, fewer than 6 million actually live in Chongqing city proper. Depending on which classification is used, Chongqing is sometimes listed as the world's largest city and, in other cases, does not even appear in the top rung of urban population rankings".

On the other side of the extreme is Metropolitan Lagos. This city has a population of nearly 8 million according to the latest census, which is debated. Official data by the Lagos State estimate the population of Metropolitan Lagos at more than 14 million. However, there is no Metropolitan Government. The Municipality of Lagos was disbanded in 1976 and divided into several Local Government Areas. As a result, the most populous city in Africa, and one of the most populous and fastest growing cities in the world can be missing from lists of cities proper. A similar situation exists in Australia, where large cities are divided into much smaller Local Government Areas, with the exception of Queensland.

Wellington is also regarded as a confusing case; unlike Auckland, which is governed by a single city council, Wellington is subdivided and governed by at least four. These are Wellington City, Porirua, Lower Hutt and Upper Hutt, with the Kapiti Coast often included. While all of these areas are contiguous and are considered to be integral parts of Wellington as a whole, they are legally distinct, thus giving Wellington a statistical population of 215,000 rather than the de facto 439,200 (measured as its metro area) or 497,200 (including the Kapiti Coast). This makes Wellington technically the third-largest city in New Zealand, rather than the second.

London may also be considered as a confusing case. The City of London could arguably be considered the "city proper" of London but has a population of only about 8600 (though the areas immediately surrounding the City of London boundaries have the same urban character as those within, and such urban character continues for some distance beyond the "Square Mile" boundary). Some lists instead state that the population of London is that of Greater London which is about 9 million. It is disputable whether Greater London is a city or a region, and also why similar treatment is not given to Manchester as distinct from Greater Manchester or Birmingham as distinct from the West Midlands metropolitan area.

== See also ==
- List of cities by country
- List of cities proper by population density
- List of largest cities
- List of national capitals by population
- List of towns and cities with 100,000 or more inhabitants
