= Pidar =

Ugaritic god

- Ugaritic: 𐎔𐎄𐎗
- Affiliation: Baal
- Major cult center: Ugarit

Pidar (Ugaritic: 𐎔𐎄𐎗, pdr) was a god worshiped in Ugarit in the late Bronze Age. He was associated with the weather god Baal, and it is often assumed his name is related to that of the goddess Pidray, but his character remains largely unknown.

== Name and character ==
The proper vocalization of the name Pidar, written in the Ugaritic alphabetic script as pdr, is confirmed by the syllabic spelling pí-dar_{6} from a text written in standard cuneiform. It is assumed that it was derived either from the Hurrian word pedari, "bull," or, less plausibly, that it is identical with Ugaritic pdr, "city." Manfred Krebernik additionally argues that the name of the goddess Pidray, one of the daughters of Baal, might be related to Pidar's. Dennis Pardee outright refers to his name as a masculine form of Pidray's, though he assumes the latter name should be translated as "Fatty." This translation is based on the similarity to the Hebrew word peder, "renal fat." This explanation of the name of this goddess is not universally accepted.

Pidar was associated with Baal. It is possible that in myths he functioned as his attendant. The possibility that he was simply an alternate name of the weather god has been ruled out by researchers. His character is otherwise unknown.

== Pidar in Ugaritic texts ==
Pidar is attested in various types of Ugaritic texts, including offering lists. In one such document, he receives a ram after Anat and before Dadmiš. He is also the recipient of the same animal in a ritual which took place in the month Gannu, roughly corresponding to part of March and April. In some further cases it is uncertain if the name of the deity receiving a sacrifice should be restored as Pidar or Pidray.

Theophoric names invoking Pidar, such as bnpdr, pdrmlk and ‘bdpdr, have also been identified in the materials from Ugarit. Seven individuals bearing such names are presently known. The frequency at which they occur is therefore comparable to names invoking Nikkal, but they are much less common than these in which the theophoric element is a name of one of the most popular deities, such as Baal, El, Resheph, Teshub or Shapash.

Contrary to an assumption present in early scholarship, Pidar is also present in Ugaritic myths. He is mentioned in a passage from the Baal Cycle in which Baal looks at his daughters Pidray and Tallay. Pidar is also present in a myth focused on Ashtart in her role of a huntress.
