= Arsay =

Ugaritic goddess, daughter of Baal

- Daughter of Baal
- Major cult center: Ugarit

Genealogy
- Parents: Baal
- Siblings: Pidray, Tallay, multiple others

Equivalents
- Hurrian: Allatu

Arsay (Ugaritic: ‘arṣy) was a goddess worshiped in the city of Ugarit in the late Bronze Age. Her standing in the Ugaritic pantheon and her role in Ugaritic religion remain uncertain. It has been proposed that she was associated with the underworld or with groundwater, though neither theory found universal support. She was most likely regarded as a daughter of the weather god Baal, though neither of the goddesses most often associated with him, Anat and Ashtart, was ever described as her mother. In a single passage from the Baal Cycle she appears alongside Pidray and Tallay, and as a result these three goddesses are often grouped in scholarship, but there is no evidence that they were associated with her in other contexts.

== Character ==
Arsay's name was derived from the Ugaritic word ‘arṣ, which can be translated as "earth" or "underworld." The final sign, y, is a common suffix of feminine names. The name is typically translated as "Earthy."

Her epithet bt y y’bdr is usually translated as "daughter of y’bdr," but Aicha Rahmouni proposes that the translation "disperser of y’bdr" might also be a plausible option. It occurs twelve times in known Ugaritic texts. The meaning of the term y’bdr is unknown. It has been suggested that it might be the name of an otherwise unknown deity, or possibly a particular attribute of Arsay. Past proposals include a euphemism for the underworld, "wide earth" (based on Arabic wa’iba, "was spacious"), "ample flowing" (based on Arabic wa’ībun, "ample," and Akkadian nadarruru, "to run its course freely"), and "rainshower" (based on Arabic ‘abba, "pour down," and Akkadian darāru, a verb referring to freely flowing water). All of these proposals found a degree of support in the field of Ugaritic studies, but Rahmouni remarks that the context does not give any clues about the meaning of y’bdr, and that many of the translations of it are most likely dubious.

It is often presumed that Arsay was a goddess associated with water. For example, Nicolas Wyatt places her in the category of deities "governing meteorological phenomena and fertility" alongside Baal (under various names), Pidray and Tallay. However, no direct references to Arsay being associated with any weather phenomena are presently known from Ugaritic texts. It has also proposed that she was associated with groundwater, though this assumption remains unproven.

On the basis of an indirect equation between Arsay and Allatu it has been proposed that she was associated with the underworld. However, some researchers, for example Manfred Krebernik, are skeptical about this assumption due to lack of other evidence pointing at such a connection. Steve A. Wiggins proposes that the equivalence might have been based on some other shared feature of both goddesses.

== Associations with other deities ==
Arsay was most likely a daughter of the weather god Baal. Like Pidray and Tallay, two other goddesses regarded as his daughters, she is referred to as one of the klt knyt, a term usually translated as "perfect brides." It is sometimes assumed that it designates the three goddesses as Baal's wives, but this conclusion is not universally accepted. Steve A. Wiggins points out that the term is not accompanied by a possessive pronominal suffix and that in at least one other Ugaritic text Pidray is described as unmarried. On this basis he argues that it is implausible that Arsay and the other two goddesses were regarded as Baal's spouses. Similarly, Daniel Schwemer finds the evidence for the supposed marital status of Arsay and her sisters unconvincing. He concludes that in the light of available evidence from Ugarit Baal "did not have a wife in any real sense." He was associated with Anat and Ashtart, but it is agreed neither of these goddesses were regarded as the mother of Arsay and her sisters.

In a list of deities written in the Ugaritic alphabetic script Arsay appears between Shapash (the sun goddess) and Išḫara (a goddess with underworld connections). In the equivalent of this text written in standard syllabic cuneiform she is replaced by Allatu, a variant spelling of the name of the Hurrian goddess of the underworld, Allani, who corresponded to Mesopotamian Ereshkigal. Allani herself was also worshiped in Ugarit.

== In Ugaritic texts ==
In the Baal Cycle, Arsay appears as one of the three goddesses presumed to be daughters of Baal, the other two being Pidray and Tallay. They are mentioned when Baal laments that he and his daughters have no place to live. While in other passages Pidray and Tallay continue to be referenced together, she makes no further appearances in this composition. It is possible that their grouping in this single fragment relies on their shared status as Baal's unmarried daughters (who according to Ugaritic custom would be expected to live in their father's house), rather than on their similar character, which might indicate that contrary to a common assumption in scholarship they did not form a triad and might have had independent roles in Ugaritic religion. Furthermore, while the grouping of Arsay, Pidray and Tallay is treated as conventional, if all Ugaritic texts are taken into consideration Baal apparently was believed to have more than three daughters, with some researchers accepting the existence of as many as six deities designated as such. Two of the daughters absent from the Baal cycle, uzr‘t and bt ‘lh, in one case seemingly appear alongside Tallay.

Arsay is also attested in offering lists. In one such text, she receives a ram after Shapash and before Ashtart. In another, she is the recipient of two ewes and a cow. Gregorio del Olmo Lete argues that this text deals with offerings to deities of the underworld.
