= Kothar-wa-Khasis =

Ugaritic, Egyptian and Phoenician craftsman god

- Divine craftsman
- Major cult center: Ugarit
- Abodes: Memphis and Caphtor

Equivalents
- Mesopotamian: Ea
- Hurrian: Eyan
- Egyptian: Keserty, possibly Ptah
- Greek: Hephaestus

Kothar-wa-Khasis (Ugaritic: 𐎋𐎘𐎗𐎆𐎃𐎒𐎒, romanized: Kôṯaru-wa-Ḫasisu), also known as Kothar or Hayyānu, was an Ugaritic god regarded as a divine artisan. He could variously play the roles of an architect, smith, musician or magician. Some scholars believe that this name represents two gods, Kothar and Khasis, combined into one.

He is well attested in ritual texts, and a number of theophoric names invoking him have been identified. He was believed to reside in Memphis and Caphtor, which might reflect the routes through which crafts and resources traveled in the late Bronze Age. He appears in various Ugaritic myths as well. In the Baal Cycle, he uses his skills on behalf of other deities. In the beginning, El enlists his help with building a temple for Yam. Later he helps Baal in his conflict with the sea god, providing him with weapons with which he ultimately triumphs. The weather god subsequently asks him for help with preparing gifts for Athirat, whose support he needs, and later with the construction of a palace of his own. He is also mentioned in the hymn to Shapash which closes this cycle of myths. In the Epic of Aqhat, he makes the bow belonging to the eponymous hero. There is some evidence that he was also introduced to Egypt, but his popularity there was limited. He was associated with the construction of temples. The name Keserty might have either referred to a god regarded as his counterpart or outright represent an Egyptian variant of his name. A connection between him and Ptah has also been suggested in past scholarship.

It is presumed that a figure known from the writings of Philo of Byblos, Chousor, represents a later, Phoenician form of Kothar-wa-Khasis. While described as a mortal by this author due to his euhemeristic views, he was presumably originally also a craftsman deity. In Phoenician History, he is credited with inventing various arts and crafts. A reference to Chousor is also present in the cosmogony of Mochos, known from a citation in citation in Damascius’ De principiis.

Uncertain attestations of Kothar-wa-Khasis include the reference to a possibly related deity named Baal-Malagê in a Neo-Assyrian treaty with Tyre, and a number of verses in the Hebrew Bible whose emending to include his name did not find universal support.

== Names ==
Kothar-wa-Khasis (Kôṯaru-wa-Ḫasisu) is the vocalization of the theonym written in the Ugaritic alphabetic script as kṯr w ḫss. The basic translation of the name is "skilled and wise", though it might also be a hendiadys, "wise craftsman". Similar names are common in the Ugaritic texts, and can be understood either as a combination of the primary name and epithet of a deity and epithet, as in the case of Kothar-wa-Khasis or Nikkal-wa-Ib, or as two closely related deities, for example Gupan and Ugar or Shahar and Shalim. In addition to the binomial name, the short form Kothar is also attested, but the second element never occurs alone. According to Alfonso Archi, the binomial form is restricted to Ugaritic myths, though an example has also been identified in a prayer. In standard syllabic cuneiform, Kothar's name could be represented by the logogram ^{d}É.A, similarly to how other Mesopotamian theonyms could be used to designate local deities of similar character.

The name Kothar is derived from the root *kšr, "to be skilled" or "to achieve", attested in both West Semitic languages and Akkadian. It has been argued that an early form of this theonym, ^{d}Ka-ša-lu, is already attested in texts from Ebla, which would indicate he was already worshiped in ancient Syria in the late third millennium BCE. However, according to Alfonso Archi Kothar is absent from Eblaite texts, and the similarly named deity mentioned in them is more likely to correspond to ^{d}Ga-ša-ru known from later sources from Emar.

=== Related terms ===
The name of the Kotharat, a group of midwifery goddesses known from Emar, Mari and Ugarit, is a cognate of Kothar's.

In Ugaritic a related term, mkṯr, referred to skilled work, and due to etymological parallels has been compared to later Greek descriptions of works of art as "daedalic". The Akkadian cognate is the verb kašāru, "to repair, to achieve". A connection between the name and Quranic Al-Kawthar (Surah 108) has also been proposed. It has been proposed that the second element of the full name, Khasis, might have been a reflection of an Akkadian epithet of Ea, ḫasīs ("wise") which might have reached Ugarit through Hurrian mediation and after being applied to an analogous local deity came to refer primarily to manual dexterity. A further attested name of Kothar is Hayyānu (hyn), which is interpreted either as a derivative of the Hurrian form of the theonym Ea, or as a cognate of Arabic hayyinun, "easy", possibly to be translated as "skillful" in this context.

The Ugaritic god Illish (Ilish) was a carpenter deity. In the past he was sometimes interpreted as an alternate name or attendant of Kothar-wa-Khasis, as originally argued by Jean Nougayrol. Today some scholars regard this translation as incorrect, and assume he was a distinct figure who functioned as a divine herald. Both words were written as ngr in the Ugaritic script.

However, other scholars still regard Ilish as a carpenter deity, being independent although similar to Kothar. Ilish also has wives who are also carpenter deities. In this, there are parallels with Kothar who seems to have kotharat as female attendants.

Carolina López-Ruiz connects Kythereia, the epithet for Aphrodite which was used since the earliest Greek epics, with Kothar (Kothar-wa-Hasis in Ugaritic). According to her, in the first millennium, Kothar was connected with the love goddess in the Cypro-Phoenician context. In Greek mythology, Aphrodite's name Kythereia traditionally linked her to the island of Kythera.

As far back as 1965, de:John Pairman Brown proposed a connection between Kothar and Kinyras (Cinyras) of Cyprus.

== Ugaritic texts ==
Kothar-wa-Khasis was a major deity in Ugaritic religion, and he is well attested in ritual texts and theophoric names. He was the main deity of craftsmanship in the Ugaritic pantheon. In the Ugaritic texts, is portrayed as a divine architect responsible for the construction of the temples of other gods. He also plays various other roles, including those of an artisan, musician and diviner. He was additionally associated with magic.

In the standard Ugaritic list of deities Kothar occupies the sixteenth position, after Mount Saphon and before Pidray. In another similar text, he instead precedes Attar. Both of these lists are presumed to document order of sacrifices in rituals. RS 1.001, a text describing a ritual taking place over the course of a full day and the following night, lists Kothar as the recipient of a sacrificial cow. The text RS 24.249, which describes offerings which should be made over the course of two months following the winter equinox, mentions the offering of two rams to him. RS 24.271, a short prayer meant to secure the well-being of the petitioner, uses the binomial form of the name. Thetrilingual edition of the Weidner god list from Ugarit equates Kothar with other gods of similar character: Eyan, a Hurrian derivative of Ea, and Mesopotamian Ea (Enki) himself, though the latter’s presence in the corresponding line was the result of reinterpretation of the name of Aya (^{d}A-a; here read as ^{d}E_{4}-a), the wife of the sun god Utu, presumably meant to avoid implying that the Ugaritic sun goddess Shapash also had a wife.

Fifteen individuals bearing theophoric names invoking Kothar have been identified in Ugaritic texts. One of them, kṯrmlk, “Kothar is king”, was a silversmith. Wilfred H. van Soldt notes that Ea, who could be identified with Kothar, appears in a large number of names, but rules out the possibility that his name serves a stand-in for Kothar-wa-Khasis in this context.

=== Dwellings of Kothar ===
Two separate places are described as Kothar’s dwelling in the Ugaritic texts. The first is Memphis, referred to as ḥqkpt or ḥkpt, from Egyptian ḥwt-kꜣ-ptḥ (Hut-ka-Ptah, “house of the ka of Ptah”). In the Baal Cycle it is characterized as “the land of his family estate” and “all divine”. As Memphis was the cult center of the craftsman god Ptah, it was presumably seen as appropriate dwelling for a deity of similar character. However, it is not certain if the name is used to refer to the real city in the context of Ugaritic mythology, as they describe it as a land instead.

The second toponym, Kaphtor (kptr; analogous to Akkadian Kaptāru and Biblical Hebrew Kaptōr), is presumed to correspond to Crete. As neither toponym refers to an area in the immediate proximity of Ugarit, it has been suggested that placing Kothar’s dwelling in such locations is meant to designate him as a foreigner among the gods. It is also possible that the location of his two homes reflected the routes of trade in metal and crafts. It has also been argued that he might have been believed to possess a workshop located in the underworld. Nicolas Wyatt speculates that perhaps this idea was tied to his residence on Caphtor, and that it might indicate familiarity with the volcanic character of nearby Santorini.

These clear overseas connections are significant, indicating trade and cultural contacts. John Curtis Franklin also brings together a considerable amount of other evidence to show that Kothar had a maritime dimension. This connects him to the sea, and makes him appear as a protector of sailors. Aspects of this are invoked in a poem of the Baal Cycle, for example.

=== Baal Cycle ===
In the Baal Cycle, Kothar is portrayed using his skills as a divine craftsman on behalf of other deities. In the beginning he is visited by messengers of El. They inform him that said god wishes to meet with him. He travels to the dwelling of El, where he greets him and prostrates himself. The senior god apparently orders him to build a palace, though the passage is fragmentary. It is presumed that it was meant for Yam.

Later on, Kothar is described forging weapons and subsequently naming them. The first receives the name Yagarrish, “may it drive”, while the second is Ayyamarri, a combination of ‘ay, “any”, and mry, “expel”. They are meant to be used by Baal in his battle with Yam. While the first weapon is not enough to defeat the sea god, striking him with the second of them lets Baal emerge victorious.

In the next section of the story, Kothar-wa-Khasis is approached by Baal’s messengers, Gupan and Ugar, who tell him that the weather god wants him to prepare gifts for Athirat in order to secure her help with gaining El’s permission to have a palace built for himself. Kothar immediately starts preparing them at his bellows. The gifts he makes include a dais, a throne with a footstool, a palanquin or couch, a table and a bowl or platter. A later passage indicates that Athirat is pleased with their quality.

After securing El’s permission to have a palace built for himself, Baal once again enlists the help of Kothar-wa-Khasis. He invites him to a feast. He seemingly holds him in high esteem, and it is presumed the passage is meant to highlight the friendship between the two. After the feast, Baal outlines his request for a palace. Kothar suggests putting a window in it, to which Baal initially objects:

“Hear, O Mightiest Baal,
Understand, O Cloud-Rider:
Shall I not install a window in the house,
An aperture inside the palace?”
And Mightiest Baal answered:
“Do not install a window in the house,
An aperture inside the palace.”

The restoration of the passage addressing Baal’s motivation issue is considered difficult or outright impossible, though it was possible to determine it contains mentions of Pidray, Tallay and Yam. It is therefore possible that the weather god is motivated by concerns for the safety of his daughters. Kothar states that he will eventually reconsider this decision. Baal eventually reverses his decision, and asks for a window to be installed. In one of the following lines, Kothar’s name is followed by the phrases bn ym // bnm ‘dt, whose interpretation is uncertain, though it is often assumed they might be either otherwise unattested epithets, “son of the sea” and “son of confluence”, or a phrase meaning “this day, this very hour”, but the context is unclear The next passage indicates he reacts to Baal’s declaration with joy:

Kothar wa-Hasis laughed,
He raised his voice and declared:
“I truly told you, O Mightiest Baal:
‘You will reconsider my word,
O Baal.’”

It is presumed that his response is meant to highlight his character as a good-natured figure. Baal proceeds to send his thunder, presumably accompanied by rains, through the window. It is possible the window reflected a belief that Baal communicates with the world by sending atmospheric phenomena through breaks in the clouds. Mark S. Smith and Wayne T. Pitard additionally note that from a narrative standpoint, Baal’s uncertainty regarding Kothar’s proposal might have simply been intended to add an element of suspense to the story, similarly to the reluctance of Athirat and El to let him have a palace built in the preceding sections.

Kothar-wa-Khasis is also mentioned in a hymn to Shapash which closes the Baal Cycle. The translation of the terms defining his connection to the sun goddess is disputed, with a majority of authors assuming he is designated as a friend or acquaintance, while a minority opinion is to interpret it as a title recognizing him as an expert in magic. His task in this passage is to “expel” and “drive” out Yam and various sea monsters, but the reasons behind his inclusion in this passage, the presentation of Yam as a threat despite his earlier defeat, or even the use of a passage focused on him and Shapash as the ending of the composition are not known.

=== Other myths ===
In the Epic of Aqhat, Kothar-wa-Khasis visits king Danel shortly after the latter learns he will have a son, and presents a bow to him as a gift. This object eventually becomes an object of Anat’s jealousy, and she tries to convince the son in mention, Aqhat, to give it to her. He tells her to approach the craftsman god herself and ask him to make her one of her own, angering her. This eventually leads to the death of the eponymous protagonist and the destruction of the bow.

In the Epic of Kirta, Kothar-wa-Khasis is mentioned alongside Baal, Yarikh, Resheph and Rahmay as one of the deities invited to a reception organized by Kirta to celebrate the arrival of his wife Huraya.

In Horon and the Mare, a mythological text provided by Dennis Pardee with the subtitle “Ridding the Land of Serpents” due to its subject matter, Kothar-wa-Khasis is listed among the deities Shapash should summon to deal with snake venom.

== Egyptian reception ==
Some evidence that Kothar-wa-Khasis was known in ancient Egypt exists, though he is not equally well attested as Resheph, Anat, Ashtart or Baal and was not a popular deity. In ancient Egyptian religion he was associated with construction of temples, as attested in the so-called Budapest Kothar Papyrus. This text cannot be dated precisely, though it is assumed it is no older than the Eighteenth Dynasty. It has the form of an incantation in which Kothar is invoked to partake in the construction of a shrine. A possible reference to him has also been identified in a late magical papyrus, though the spelling of the name is ambiguous in this case.

According to Izak Cornelius, the Egyptian god Keserty corresponded to Kothar, though his iconography instead resembles Resheph’s, including a similar crown decorated with a gazelle’s head. László Kákosy assumes Keserty was an alternate Egyptian spelling of Kothar’s name, though he notes this theonym differs from the form used in the Budapest Kothar Papyrus. Keserty is known from a stele of unknown provenance from the collection of the Cairo Museum, which depicts a man identified as “the engraver, Woše-seti” praying to this god, who is seated on a throne. Due to the overlapping iconography, identification of Keserty as a distinct deity was only possible due to his name being directly mentioned in the inscription. Following William F. Albright’s early studies, it is sometimes assumed that Kothar might also have been regarded as analogous to Ptah.

== Phoenician and Punic sources ==
Chousor, attested in Phoenician History of Philo of Byblos, is assumed to represent a Phoenician reflection of Kothar-wa-Khasis. Due to his euhemeristic views, Philo presents Chousor as a human, rather than a god, though it is assumed more traditionalist adherents of Phoenician religion saw him as a deity, much like how the Ugaritic Kothar was perceived in corresponding cultural milieu. Ptolemy mentions a river named Chousor, presumably named after this deity. The case of Chousor was the first instance in scholarship in which a figure formerly known only from Phoenician History could be properly identified.

Philo describes Chousor as a distant descendant of Hypsouranios, who according to his account was the founder of Tyre. He uses the names Chousor and Hephaestus interchangeably, similarly to how he refers to Kronos as El in some passages. Alongside his nameless brother, Chousor is credited with the discovery of iron working. Due to the Bronze Age origin of the Ugaritic texts, this skill is never assigned to Kothar-wa-Khasis in them, and he only works with gold and silver, which is in turn not mentioned in Phoenician History among the skills of Chousor. Acting on his own, Chousor also invented fishing implements (hook, bait, fishing line and raft), which according to Philo lead to the use of the name of Zeus Meilichius to refer to him. The reason behind this connection is uncertain, though it might rely on both deities being viewed as benevolent givers of wealth. Chousor according to him was also the first to prepare magical formulas, incantations and prophecies. In a further passage his brothers, who are left nameless, are credited with inventing brickwork, which might be a reflection of Kothar-wa-Khasis' role as a divine architect. Albert I. Baumgarten suggests that the assignment of individual inventions to multiple members of Chousor’s family might have been either the result of Philo misunderstanding the use of multiple names to refer to Kothar-wa-Khasis as a reference to a network of related deities, similarly as early researchers of Ugaritic texts erroneously did, or a sign of Greek influence, as in Athenian tradition Hephaestus had multiple sons, who might have inspired the other craftsmen in Phoenician History.

Kothar shows multiple mythological parallels with Hephaestus. Just like Hephaestus, Kothar has excellent architectural and metallurgical skills. In this, he “overlaps in function and techniques with Hephaistos and his relationship to Homeric gods”. Kothar also occupies a similar role in the pantheon of Ugaritic gods as Hephaistos does among the Homeric gods.

There are also some parallels in this area with the famous biblical craftsmen Bezalel and Oholiab (Exodus 31:2).

Chousor also plays an active role in the cosmogony of Mochos, known from a citation in Damascius' De principiis. It involves a world egg, which Chousor opens. It is assumed that his actions in this text were patterned on deeds commonly attributed to Egyptian Ptah. William F. Albright went as far as suggesting that his actions were a pun on Ptah's name, though his proposal relied on presuming the existence of a hypothetical West Semitic root *ptḥ, "to open".

Punic and Neo-Punic names with the element k(y)šr are considered an indication that Kothar was also worshiped in Punic religion.

== Disputed attestations ==
=== Baal-Malagê ===
A connection between Philo’s Zeus Meilichius/Chousor and the Phoenician deity Baal-Malagê has been proposed, but is considered unlikely. The latter is attested in a treaty between king Baal of Tyre and the Neo-Assyrian emperor Esarhaddon from the first millennium BCE. Richard J. Clifford nonetheless proposes the identification of Baal-Malagê as a title of the craftsman god. However, he admits this deity is “elusive”. Aaron J. Brody instead views him as an aspect of the weather god Baal associated with seafaring. and rules out a connection with any version of Kothar-wa-Khasis. In a recent study Reettakaisa Sofia Salo concludes that the character of Baal-Malagê remains unknown as he is not attested outside of a single source and the possible marine associations rely largely on uncertain etymological speculation, though she does accept that he was likely a hypostasis of Baal.

=== Taautos ===
It has been suggested that a figure known from Philo’s writings, Taautos, might have been the result of identification between Thoth and Kothar-wa-Khasis, but according to Albert I. Baumgarten this theory is implausible, and it can be assumed he was derived directly from the Egyptian god.

=== Hebrew Bible ===
It has been proposed that three passages from the Hebrew Bible, Ezekiel 3:32, Proverbs 31:19 and Judges 3:8.10, might contain allusions to Kothar-wa-Khasis. However, according to Dennis Pardee none of these proposals are plausible, as the conventional translations of the former two passages are “satisfactory” and emending any words is not necessary, while the interpretation of Cushan-rishathaim as containing a variant of the theonym Kothar as a theophoric element is unlikely. It has also been proposed that Bezalel, a craftsman mentioned in Exodus 30:3, was patterned on descriptions of Kothar-wa-Khasis. Both the account of palace building in the Baal Cycle and the construction of the tabernacle in Exodus 35-36, in which he was involved, might rely on a shared literary tradition in which a specific formula was used for construction narratives.

In the Islamic tradition, Khidr is a righteous servant of God who possesses great wisdom and mystic knowledge, and he had been linked with Kothar. Khidr is described as an angel, a prophet, or wali who guards the sea, teaches secret knowledge and aids those in distress.

== See also ==
- Kinnaru
- Cinyras
- Kinnor (Bible)
