= Baalah =

Baalah, properly Baʿalah ("Mistress" or "Lady" in the Northwest Semitic languages, sometimes Baʿalat) is the feminine form of Baʿal ("Lord") and was applied to various Levantine goddesses.

It was also the name of several places in ancient Palestine:

- Another name of Kirjath-jearim
- A city in Negev given to Simeon, also romanized as Bilhah (1 Chr. 4:29) and Balah (Josh. 19:3)
- A mount in Judah, between Jabneel and Shikkeron; maybe today's Mughar

== See also ==
- Asherah
- Baal
- Ba‘alat Gebal ("Lady of Byblos")
