= Pidray =

Ugaritic goddess, daughter of Baal

- Daughter of Baal
- Major cult center: Ugarit

Genealogy
- Parents: Baal
- Siblings: Tallay, Arsay, multiple others

Equivalents
- Mesopotamian: Nanaya
- Hurrian: Ḫepat

Pidray (Ugaritic: 𐎔𐎄𐎗𐎊, pdry) was an Ugaritic goddess of uncertain character. She is first attested as an Amorite deity in a bilingual Mesopotamian lexical list, but she is otherwise almost exclusively from Ugaritic texts. While she is well attested in this text corpus, her role in Ugaritic religion remains uncertain. It has been proposed that she was one of the tutelary deities of the kings of Ugarit. Another proposal connects her with the weather, though this assumption is not universally accepted. The meaning of her name also continues to be disputed. In Ugaritic myths, she is described as a daughter of the weather god Baal. In the Baal Cycle, she appears alongside the goddess Tallay, regarded as her sister. In a single passage they are also joined by Arsay. Pidray alone is also mentioned in the myth Marriage of Nikkal and Yarikh.

== Name and character ==
The oldest spelling of Pidray's name. attested in an Old Babylonian Amorite-Akkadian bilingual lexical list, is pi-id-ra-a, with ra-a presumably pronounced as /ray/ in this case. It is spelled as pdry in the Ugaritic alphabetic script. The correct vocalization is confirmed by the syllabic spelling pí-id-ra-i in an Akkadian letter from Ugarit written in the standard cuneiform script. Another syllabic spelling attested in sources from this city is pi-id-ra-yu. The etymology of this name remains uncertain. It is sometimes translated as "Fatty", based on the similarity to the uncommonly used Hebrew word peder, referring to a type of fat, specifically renal fat. However, this proposal was challenged as early as in 1969 by Michael C. Astour. Another theory links it with the root pdr/bdr, "to scatter" or "to spread," which is attested in many Semitic languages. According to Steve A. Wiggins, it relies on the assumption that Pidray's name would reflect her hypothetical role as a weather deity, which is not directly attested in any texts. A different translation proposal relying on this assumption is "Flashy", based on a speculative connection with lightning. Proponents of this view tentatively identify the element pdr as a synonym of better attested bqr, "lightning". While it is sometimes proposed that her epithet, "daughter of light" (bt ‘ar; an alternate translation proposed by Aicha Rahmouni is "disperser of light"), which is attested twelve times in known Ugaritic texts, might indicate that she was associated with lightning, neither the Ugaritic words ‘ir ("light") and ‘wr ("to shine") on which its translation depends nor their Akkadian, Arabic and Hebrew cognates are used to specifically refer to this atmospheric phenomenon. Less commonly ‘ar is treated as a cognate of Arabic ‘aryun, which can be translated as "honey," "dew," "mist" or "moisture." Despite this speculation, no direct evidence in favor of interpreting Pidray as a weather goddess exists.

Manfred Krebernik suggests that Pidray's name might be etymologically related to that of the minor god Pidar. Krebernik notes that while in the past Pidar's name was considered to be derived from Ugaritic pdr, "city," it is most likely related to the Hurrian word pedari, "bull." Dennis Pardee outright identifies Pidray's and Pidar's names as the feminine and masculine forms of the same word, but believes that "Fatty" is the most plausible translation. Juan Pablo Vita assumes that Pidray had Hurrian origin, without speculating about the precise etymology of her name.

It has been suggested that Pidray might have functioned as one of the tutelary deities of the ruling house of Ugarit or of the kingdom as a whole, as she is attested in relation to the royal palace.

== Associations with other deities ==
Pidray is the best attested of the Ugaritic goddesses regarded as daughters of Baal. It is sometimes assumed that she formed a triad with his other daughters, Tallay and Arsay, though this view has been criticized by Steve A. Wiggins, who points out that Arsay appears with the other two goddesses only once in the entire text corpus, in a passage from the Baal Cycle in which Baal laments that he has no house. Manfred Krebernik accepts the notion of the three as a triad, but notes that Pidray nonetheless commonly appears in Ugaritic texts on her own. Similar to Tallay and Arsay, Pidray is referred to as one of the klt knyt, "perfect brides", in a single passage from the Baal Cycle. While it is sometimes argued that this epithet designates the three of them as Baal's wives, this conclusion does not enjoy universal acceptance among experts. Steve A. Wiggins points out that Pidray in particular is described as unmarried in another myth, and that the term is unlikely to designate the three goddesses as Baal's wives because it is not accompanied by a possessive pronominal suffix. He proposes that its used in an anticipatory sense, to illustrate that the three goddesses are presently unmarried. Daniel Schwemer also assumes that they were not regarded as Baal's spouses, and goes as far as arguing that the weather god did not have a wife in Ugaritic tradition. Wiggins also points out that the fact Pidray and her sisters apparently have no home fits with the status of daughters of Baal in the context of the Baal Cycle, as in Ugaritic culture unmarried daughters were expected to live in the house of their father.

There is no evidence that either of the goddesses associated with Baal, Anat or Ashtart, was regarded as the mother of Pidray or her sisters.

Gabriele Theuer proposes that ybdrmy was an epithet or alternate name of Pidray. This deity is mentioned in the myth Marriage of Nikkal and Yarikh as one of the goddesses which according to Ḫiriḫibi Yarikh could marry instead of Nikkal. She is not otherwise attested in any Ugaritic texts. Wilfred G. E. Watson and Daniel Schwemer consider ybrdmy to be one of the daughters of Baal, but not as the same deity as Pidray. It has also been suggested that she was a sister of Attar or his daughter.

In one of the Ugaritic deity lists, Pidray is placed between the craftsman god Kothar and the warrior god Attar. In another, she occurs between Šarruma and Daqitu. Dennis Pardee argues that the latter goddess should be considered a member of the same group of deities as Pidray.

An Amorite-Akkadian bilingual lexical list presents Pidray as the Amorite counterpart of the Mesopotamian goddess Nanaya. An equivalence between Pidray and the Hurrian goddess Ḫepat is attested in Ugaritic texts. Wilfred H. van Soldt argued that theophoric names from Ugarit invoking the latter goddess, fourteen of which are known, use her name as a stand-in for Pidray. However, Steve A. Wiggins notes that fully equating Pidray and Ḫepat is "unwarranted". Daniel Schwemer remarks that there is no indication that she functioned as the wife of the weather god, unlike Ḫepat, who was regarded as the wife of Teshub.

== Worship ==
The oldest attestation of Pidray has been identified in an Amorite-Akkadian bilingual dated to the Old Babylonian period and first published by Andrew R. George and Manfred Krebernik in 2022. They conclude that while she is otherwise only attested as an actively worshiped deity in late Bronze Age Ugarit, it can be assumed that in the Old Babylonian period she was venerated in various areas inhabited by Amorites, singling out a possible connection to Aleppo.

Pidray is well attested in religious texts from Ugarit, and it has been argued that she played an important role in the religious life of this city. The first tablet discovered during excavations in 1929 mentions her among the deities receiving offerings during an elaborate ritual apparently taking place over the course of a day and a night. During the part of it taking place at night, near the end of the ceremony, Pidray received a cow after the same offering to Šarruma and before the offering of an ewe to Daqitu. Further ritual texts mention Pidray receiving a ram as a burnt offering in the temple of Baal and another as a "peace offering". A text labeled as "sacrifice to the gods of Mount Saphon" lists her as a recipient of a ram between Kothar and "Mountains and Waters-of-the-Abyss". Pidray is also most likely also referenced in the closing line of a Hurrian ritual from Ugarit (KTU 1.42). This text is assumed to be a description of ritual anointing of statues of deities. In some other cases it is uncertain if the deity listed is Pidray or Pidar due to the state of preservation of the tablets making restoration of the full name difficult.

A festival dedicated to Pidray is also attested. It is known that it involved the preparation of a bed for her, though the exact purpose of this action remains unknown. It has been suggested that it represented a hieros gamos rite or an incubation, but Dennis Pardee notes that no further information in favor or against one of these possibilities is available. He proposes that it might have been focused on contemplation of the deity as another alternative. It took place on the nineteenth day of an unknown month. It is possible that it was the culmination of a full moon celebration. The same ritual might be mentioned in another text which states that at a certain point during the year, Pidray was present in the "house of the king." A direct reference to sacrifices made to Pidray in the royal palace is also known from an administrative tablet listing the supplies of wine provided by various towns in the proximity of Ugarit.

Pidray is mentioned in a greeting formula in the letter of Šaušgamuwa, king of Amurru, to Ammištamru II, king of Ugarit, alongside the weather god from a location whose name is damaged and "the thousand gods".

A single late attestation of Pidray is known from outside Ugarit. A papyrus written in Aramaic in the Demotic script mentions "Pidray of Raphia" alongside Baal of Saphon. This document has been described as an isolated example.

== Mythology ==
Pidray appears in the Baal Cycle. During a banquet, she is listed alongside Tallay as one of the two goddesses Baal was gazing at for uncertain reasons. Both of them, as well as Arsay, are also referenced when he laments that he has no house to live in. Later, when Baal discusses the installation of a window in his palace with Kothar-wa-Khasis, once again Pidray is mentioned alongside Tallay. The weather god initially protests the proposal to add windows because he is worried that, depending on interpretation, his two daughters might either flee through them or be kidnapped by his enemy, the sea god Yam, mentioned in the same passage in an uncertain context. It has been pointed out that apparently Baal values their safety highly, as it appears to be his primary concern during the argument over his palace. His fears apparently turn out to be unfounded, as no subsequent passages refer to Pidray and Tallay fleeing or being kidnapped. Finally, Baal is told to take these two goddesses with him when he descends to the underworld. No mention of them is made after his return from the dead. Based on their passive role in these passages, Steve A. Wiggins concludes that in the Baal Cycle they are portrayed as "minors, not yet of an age to have adventures of their own."

Another myth which references Pidray is Marriage of Nikkal and Yarikh. Ḫiriḫibi mentions her as one of the goddesses who Yarikh could marry instead of Nikkal. However, the moon god rejects this proposal.
