= Tallay =

Ugaritic goddess of dew, daughter of Baal

- Goddess of dew
- Major cult center: Ugarit

Genealogy
- Parents: Baal
- Siblings: Pidray, Arsay, multiple others

Tallay (Ugaritic: 𐎉𐎍𐎊, ṭly) was an Ugaritic goddess associated with the weather, especially with dew and light rain. She is sparsely attested in known Ugaritic texts, and does not appear in offering lists, though it is nonetheless assumed she was actively worshiped. She appears in the Baal Cycle as one of the daughters of the eponymous god, usually alongside Pidray, though in a single passage they are additionally accompanied by Arsay.

== Character ==
Tallay's name is derived from the Ugaritic word ṭl, "dew," while the final sign, y, is a common suffix of feminine names. It is translated as "Dewy." Manfred Krebernik points out that presumably linguistically related ṭá-la-ia also occurs in a text from Ugarit written in the standard syllabic cuneiform script as an ordinary given name. Tallay's epithet, bt rb, which occurs nine times in known Ugaritic texts, is typically translated as "daughter of showers," "daughter of rain" or "daughter of drizzle." Aicha Rahmouni argues that the word bt might also be understood less directly as "disperser," rather than "daughter." It is agreed that rb is a cognate of the word rbb, "drizzle." The translation of both the name and the epithet of Tallay are not a subject of ongoing debate among experts, unlike those of her sisters Pidray and Arsay.

It is agreed that Tallay was regarded as a weather deity, much like her father Baal. Most likely she was specifically associated with dew, as indicated by her name, and with light rain. Tallay's character as a weather deity is sometimes also used as an argument in favor of assigning such a role to her sisters, but the evidence in favor of regarding Pidray as a weather goddess is considered weak and it is entirely lacking in the case of Arsay, who was most likely associated with the underworld instead.

== Associations with other deities ==
The weather god Baal was regarded as the father of Tallay. Among other goddesses regarded as his daughters were Pidray, Arsay, and a number of more sparsely attested deities, known from only one text each, such as uzr’t. It is often assumed that Tallay, Pidray and Arsay formed a triad. However, while Tallay and Pidray appear together in multiple passages, and do seem to be closely associated with each other in the Baal Cycle, Arsay is listed alongside them only once, and in offering lists she functions entirely on her own. On this basis, Steve A. Wiggins suggests that the three of them were not necessarily considered a triad, and likely had independent roles in Ugaritic religion.

Much like Pidray and Arsay, in a single passage from the Baal Cycle Tallay is said to be one of the klt knyt, "perfect brides." It has been argued that this title designates them as the wives of Baal, but this conclusion is not universally accepted due to existence of evidence on the contrary, such as Pidray's status as an unmarried goddess in another text and the fact that on lexical grounds there is no clear evidence that klt knyt contains a possessive pronominal suffix making it possible to say with certainty that the three goddesses are specifically designated as Baal's brides. Steve A. Wiggins argues that its meaning is metaphorical, and that based on cultural context it can be assumed that the sisters are Baal's unmarried daughters who still live with their father. Manfred Krebernik's evaluation is more reserved and he refers to the relation between the deities as "ambivalent." Daniel Schwemer argues that there is no convincing evidence that Tallay and her sisters were Baal's wives and points out that there is no clear indication that the weather god actually had a permanent spouse in Ugaritic tradition, even though he was closely associated with both Anat and Ashtart. There is also no evidence that either of these two goddesses was regarded as the mother of Tallay or her sisters.

== Tallay in the Ugaritic texts ==
Tallay is chiefly known from the Baal Cycle. Baal watches over her and Pidray during a banquet, and both of them, as well as Arsay, are mentioned when he laments that unlike other gods, he has no house. Tallay and Pidray are also mentioned together when their father and the craftsman god Kothar-wa-Khasis debate the construction of a palace for the former. Baal initially argues it cannot have windows, because his daughters, depending on the accepted interpretation of the passage, might either flee through them or end up either kidnapped by his enemy, the sea god Yam. The safety of Tallay and Pidray appears to be his main concern in this passage, but there is no evidence that they actually were in danger, as there is no reference to either of the goddesses being kidnapped or escaping in the remaining sections of the text. Later, when Baal receives instructions pertaining to the descent to the underworld, he is told to take Tallay, as well as Pidray, with him. They are however not mentioned in the subsequent part of the narrative dealing with his return to the land of the living. In all of these passages, Pidray is listed before Tallay, which most likely indicates she was understood as the more important goddess.

Only one reference to Tally from outside the Baal Cycle is known. She most likely appears in the text KTU 1.101. It also mentions two goddesses presumed to be daughters of Baal absent from the Baal Cycle, uzr‘t and bt ‘lh. Wilfred G. E. Watson proposes translating their names as, respectively, "rapid (drops of rain)" and "daughter of the channel."

Unlike Pidray and Arsay, Tallay does not appear in any offering lists. However, Steve A. Wiggins argues that since dew played a significant role in the life of farmers in Bronze Age Syria, she was most likely actively worshiped by the population of Ugarit, and the fact she is sparsely attested in known sources does not necessarily indicate she was entirely insignificant in Ugaritic religion.
