= Baal Cycle =

Levantine mythological cycle of stories

- Ugaritic text
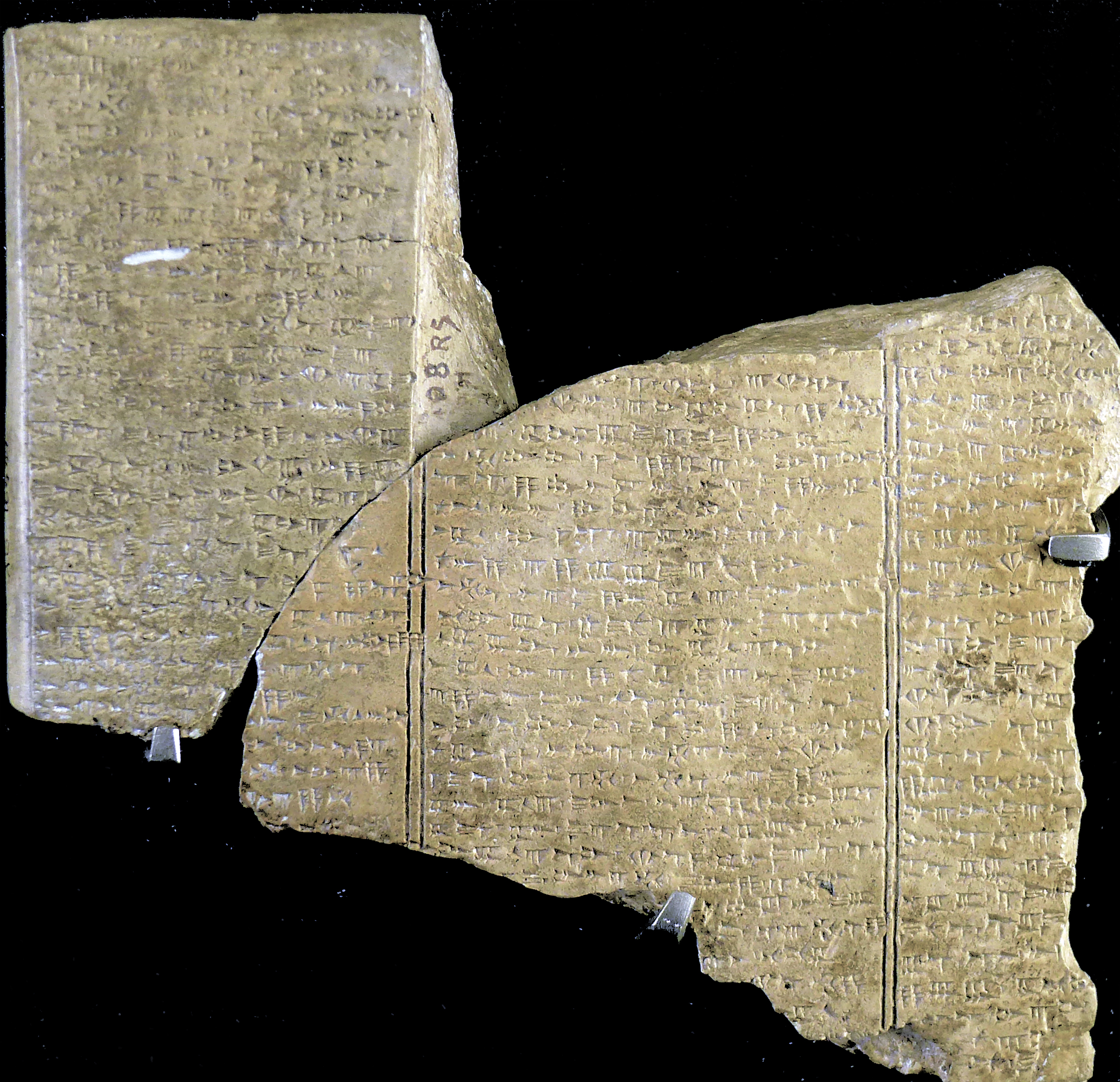
- Cuneiform tablet of the Baal Cycle

Information
- Religion: Canaanite religion
- Language: Ugaritic
- Period: c. 1300–1100 BCE
- Chapters: Six tablets (KTU 1.1–1.6)

The Baal Cycle is an Ugaritic text (c. 1300–1100 BCE) about the Canaanite god Baʿal (𐎁𐎓𐎍 lit. "Owner", "Lord"), a storm god associated with fertility. It consists of six tablets, itemized as KTU 1.1–1.6. Tablets one (KTU 1.1) and two (KTU 1.2) are about the cosmic battle between the storm-god Baal and the sea god Yam, where the former attains victory. The next two tablets (KTU 1.3–1.4) describe the construction of Baal's palace that marks his cosmic kingship. The last two tablets (KTU 1.5–1.6) describe Baal's struggles against Mot, the god of the underworld.

The text identifies Baal as the god Hadad, the Northwest Semitic form of Adad. The stories are written in Ugaritic, a Northwest Semitic language, and written in a cuneiform abjad. It was discovered on a series of clay tablets found in the 1920s in the tell of Ugarit (then known as Ras/Tell Shamra), situated on the Mediterranean coast of northern Syria a few kilometers north of the city of Latakia and far from the current coastline. The stories include The Myth of Baʿal Aliyan and The Death of Baʿal. A critical edition of the Baal Cycle was published by Charles Virolleaud in 1938. A fragment of the Baal Cycle was discovered in pre-Islamic Arabia.

== Overview ==
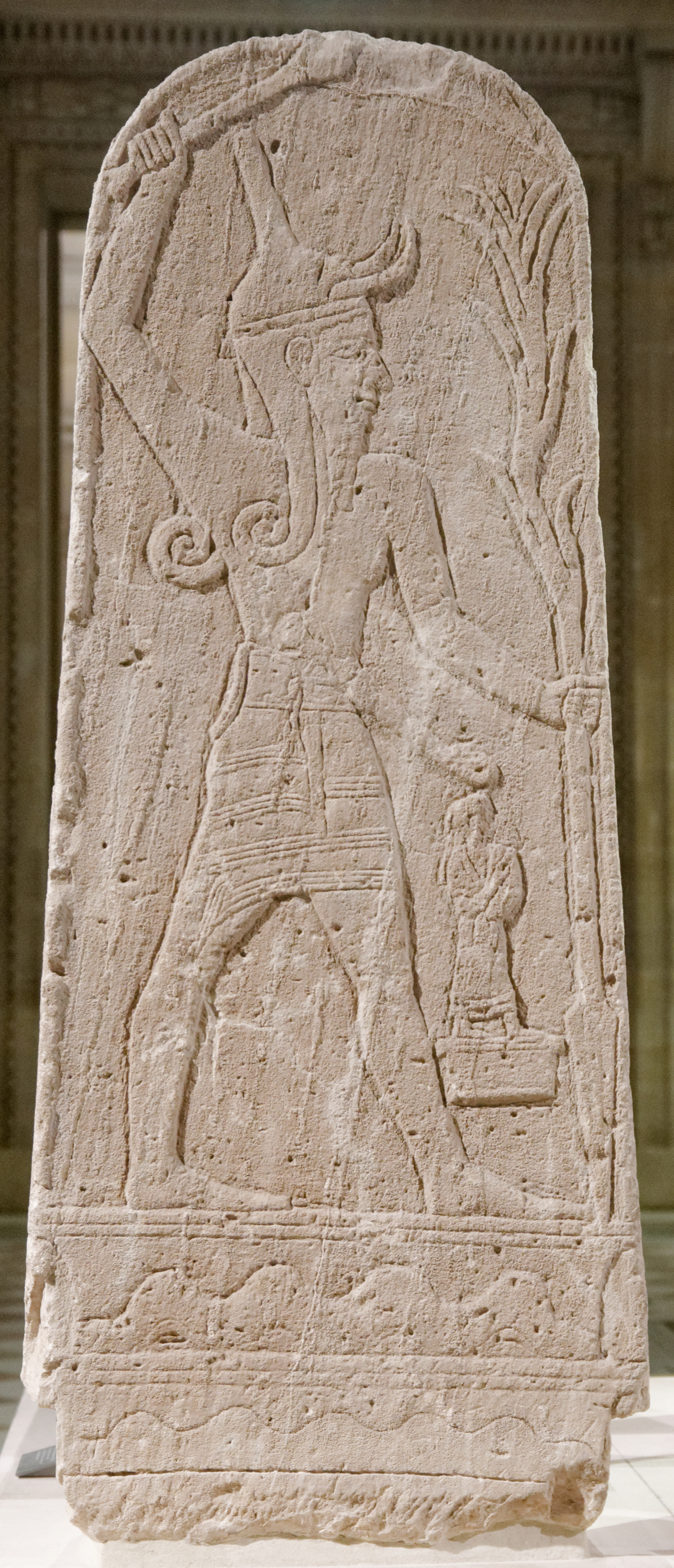
Statue of Baal with Thunderbolt from Ugarit

The Baʿal Cycle series of stories are summarized as:

- Yam wants to rule over the other gods and be the most powerful of all
- Baʿal Hadad opposes Yam and slays him
- Baʿal Hadad, with the help of Anat and Athirat, persuades El to allow him a palace
- Baʿal Hadad commissions Kothar-wa-Khasis to build him a palace.
- King of the gods and ruler of the world seeks to subjugate Mot
- Mot kills Baʿal Hadad
- Anat brutally kills Mot, grinds him up and scatters his ashes
- Baʿal Hadad returns to Jebel Aqra (Ugaritic: 𐎕𐎔𐎐, romanized: Ṣapunu, Biblical Hebrew: צָפוֹן, romanized: Ṣapōn)
- Mot, having recovered from being ground up and scattered, challenges Baʿal Hadad
- Baʿal Hadad refuses; Mot submits
- Baʿal Hadad rules again

== Main characters ==
The main characters of the Baal Cycle are as follows:

- Hadad, called Baal "lord", the storm god and protagonist, whose abode is on the Syrian mountain Jebel Aqra ("Zaphon")
- Yam, the sea god and primary antagonist of Baal in the first two tablets of the Baal Cycle
- Mot, the underworld god and primary antagonist of Baal in the last two tablets
- Anat, sister and major ally to Baal
- ʿAṯtar, god of the stars
- El, the king of the gods, and his wife, Athirat, queen and mother of the pantheon. These characters have the highest rank in the Baal Cycle.
- Kothar, a craftsman and spell-caster who serves various deities, primarily lives in Memphis and Caphtor
- Shapshu, the sun god and a mediator of messages between rival gods
- Several messenger gods serving specific higher-ranking deities:
  - Servants of Yam, including Lotan and additional unnamed figures
  - Two messengers of Baal called Gupan and Ugar
  - Two messengers of Athirat, Qudšu-wa-Amrur.
- Pidray, Tallay, and Arsay; the three daughters of Baal

Though Baal attains kingship, he is not to be compared to the exalted status gods of other narratives like Marduk from the Enūma Eliš or Yahweh. His kingship is limited, attained by difficult single combat and with the help of other gods, and his overcoming of his enemies is not permanent.

== Synopsis ==
=== Tablets 1–2: Baal and Yam ===
The beginning of the story of the battle between Baʿal and Yam is lost, but we first hear of Kothar, the craftsman of the gods being summoned to El, who resides at the confluence of the rivers and the two oceans. El tells him to build a palace for Yam, and to do so quickly in case Yam should take hostile action. When Athtar hears of this, they take down a torch, the purpose of which is not known due to the damaged text, but they are confronted by Shapshu, who tells them that El is to bestow royal power on Yam, and so opposition is useless. Athtar then complains that he has no place or court, and that he now fears defeat at the hands of Yam. Shapshu suggests the reason to be that he has no wife, perhaps meaning he is too young.

The text following is lost, but resumes with El sitting in his banquet hall. Here he is addressed by the other deities, who complain that Yam is being put to shame. Though the damaged text makes the reason unclear, it seems the reason is connected to his palace. The gods threaten that unless this situation is resolved they will wreak destruction. El gives them curdled milk, apparently a mark of esteem. El then declares that his son Yam's personal name, which hitherto has been Yaw (in contrast to his generic title 'Yam'), should henceforth become 'darling of El'. However, he informs Yam that he would have to drive his rival Baʿal from his throne and the seat of his dominion. Following this there is a banquet.

When the story resumes, Kothar has arrived under the sea and tells Yam that he has risen presumptuously to his position, and that Baʿal cannot stand idly by. He threatens that Yam will be destroyed by a magic weapon. Yam then sends word to El, on the mountain where El lives, demanding the surrender of Baʿal and his henchmen. However, Baʿal, upon hearing this on the mount of Lel attacks the envoys, though ʿAnath and Athtart hold him back.

When the story resumes, Baʿal has already started to battle Yam, but is in despair due to the power of Yam, and the fierce sea-creatures. Kothar assures Baʿal that he will be victorious and will win a kingdom without end, and fetches two divine clubs for Baʿal's use. He gives them magic names, and strikes Yam the first two times himself. Baʿal then drags out Yam and finishes him off. Then Athtart tells Baʿal to scatter his rival, which he does, and then he cries out that Yam is dead, and that he shall be King.

=== Tablets 3–4: Palace of Baal ===
A description of the palace of Baʿal follows. It begins with a description of a banquet thrown in honour of Baʿal on Zaphon (Jebel Aqra). When the text resumes, we see Anat closing the door of her mansion and meeting her servants in a valley where there are two cities, which possibly represent Ugarit and its port. She kills the guards and warriors, and then drives away the townspeople. She then slaughters the guards and warriors in her palace, ending with a peace-offering. When the text resumes again, Baʿal is addressing his messengers, picturing his sister Anat sitting with her lyre and singing of her affection for him and his daughters. The messengers are told to perform a specific rite, and she will give them an important communication for Baʿal, the secret of the lightning. Together, Anat and Baʿal will search for the secret on the hill of Zephon. She replies that she would only perform the rite if Baʿal should set his thunderbolt in the sky and flash his lightning. She then joins Baʿal at Zephon.

When the text resumes Baʿal complains to Anat that he hasn't a house, nor a court like other gods, meaning that he has to live in the dwelling of his father El and Athirat. Anat thus makes a threat against El, threatening to make his grey hair run with blood unless he allows Baʿal to have a palace. The earthquakes at her feet cause El to be exposed from his chamber. Though the text following is lost, it is clear this attempt was unsuccessful, so Baʿal dispatches Qudšu-wa-Amrur the attendant of Athirat, to deliver a message to Kothar, whose home is in Egypt. When the text continues, Qudšu-wa-Amrur delivers Baʿal's message, which is that Kothar should fashion gifts for Athirat, presumably so she will support Baʿal's bid for a palace. He enters his forge, and produces magnificent pieces of furniture, a pair of sandals, and a decorated table and bowl.

When the text continues we see Athirat performing her woman's work by the seashore, when she then sees Baʿal and Anat approaching. She wonders whether he has come to kill all her sons and kinsfolk, perhaps a reference to the Hittite myth of Elkunirša, where the storm-god boasts of having killed the many sons of Athirat. However, her anger subsides when she sees the gifts, and so supports Baʿal in his bid, and she calls upon Qudšu-wa-Amrur to cast a net into the sea so she may have provisions to entertain the guests with. They do so, and when the text continues we see Anat encouraging Baʿal as they come closer to Athirat, reminding that he will have an eternal kingdom. However, Baʿal is still anxious. They persuade Athirat of their case.

She proceeds to El's abode, and makes her case. Reluctantly, he gives his assent for a house to be built for Baʿal. Baʿal is then instructed to collect cedar-wood, bricks and precious metals in order to build his house. Kothar builds him a palace, but Baʿal insists that it is built without windows, in case that his daughters may escape, or that Yam may come again and trouble him. The work is completed and Baʿal rejoices. When the text resumes, Baʿal recalls his triumph over Yam, and then marches out taking many cities his own. He then consents to having windows to his Palace, and does so by thundering them out. While sitting in his palace he asks himself whether anybody would resist his power, and if anybody should, he should send word to Mot, god of death, to deal with them. He sends two messengers to Mot inviting him to a feast and to acknowledge his sovereignty. In the ending, which is lost, Mot makes his reply.

=== Tablets 5–6: Baal and Mot ===
The final part of the Baʿal cycle is concerned with Baʿal's battle against Mot, a personification of Death. Continuing from the preceding section, Mot concludes his reply to Baʿal. His reply is that he, like a lion in the desert, hungers constantly for human flesh and blood. Mot is offended by Ba'al's invitation to a meal of bread and wine and threatens to cause the heavens to wilt and collapse, breaking Baʿal into pieces. Mot then will eat him piece by piece. When the text continues, Baʿal, or a speaker on his behalf, admits his fear and dread of Mot. The speaker then tells Gupan and Ugar to go back to Mot and tell him that Baʿal will be eternally his slave, news in which Mot rejoices. When the text continues Baʿal complains to El that his dominion is in danger of passing to Mot. He then sends messengers to Sheger and Ithm, who are responsible for Cattle and Sheep, and asks them to provide animals for a feast, to which he will invite Mot. When the text continues, a messenger from Mot arrives in the divine assembly, demanding to know where Baʿal is. They both go up to El's house where El asks what has been happening. When the text continues, a speaker, who is probably Shapash the sun-goddess, addresses Baʿal. She is advising him to find a substitute in his image, who will be sought out and slain by Mot. She then promises to bury his body, and advises him to go to the two mountains which mark the entrance of the underworld, and to move them aside. Then he is to go down into the earth and hide. He finds a heifer in the fields, and conceives with it a human child, whom he dresses in his robes and offers as a gift to Mot.

When the text continues, two deities, (presumably Baʿal's servants Gupan and Ugar) arrive at El's abode, and they announce to him that they have been searching for Baʿal, but found him dead by the bank of the river of death. El then descends from his throne and sits on the ground, and mourns, strewing dust on his head, wears clothes of sackcloth, shaves off his beard and beats his chest in grief. Anat too wears sackcloth when she finds the dead body of the substitute. Shapash aids Anat in burying Baʿal upon Mount Zephon, and Anat slaughters large numbers of oxen, sheep, goats, and asses as a memorial. Anat returns to El, and tells Athirat and her family (many of whom were on the side of Mot) that they can rejoice, since Baʿal is dead. El asks Athirat whom can he appoint in Baʿal's place, and she suggests Athtar. Athtar seats himself on Baʿal's throne but is not tall enough, confirming El's suspicion that he is too weak for the position.

When the text resumes, Anat is searching in the netherworld for the shade of her brother. She demands that Mot restore him to her. However, Mot answers that he had searched for him over the earth, where he found him at the entrance of his domain, and then he simply ate him. Anat continues her search, until she loses patience, and she seizes Mot, and attacks him with a sword, shaking him, burning him, crushing him, then throwing his remains to the birds. When the text continues, Anat returns to El and announces that Mot is dead. El then has a dream which tells him that Baʿal lives. Shortly after that, Baʿal returns. However, soon Mot comes back to life and complains to Baʿal of the treatment he has received. He demands that Baʿal surrender one of Mot's brothers. When Mot has returned, Baʿal sends messengers telling him that he will banish him, and that if he is hungry, he may eat the servants of Baʿal. However, this fails to please Mot, and so the two gods fight on Mount Zephon until exhausted. Shapash arrives and warns Mot that fighting Baʿal is useless, and that El is now on Baʿal's side and will overturn Mot's throne. Mot is afraid, and so declares that Baʿal is king.

== Interpretations ==
The death of Baʿal and the reign of Mot has been regarded as a seasonal myth, marking Baʿal as a vegetation god whose death and rebirth is responsible for the Levant's summer drought and autumn rains. However, Oldenburg argues against this, saying it instead represents "a special catastrophe of drought and infertility when the rain does not come in its season."

The cycle's elaborate details about the building of Ba'al's palace is thought to reflect the rites of a forgotten Canaanite autumnal festival that involved the building of booths representing Ba'al's palace (perhaps a precursor to the Jewish holiday of Sukkot), and a Canaanite belief that building them precisely was imperative for the renewal of the rains.

== Historical context ==
The Ugaritic Baʿal Cycle is one of several ancient near eastern narratives that record a cosmic battle between a sea and a storm god. Such narratives are also known from ancient Israel and Judah, Babylonia, Ancient Egypt, and Anatolia. In particular, the version of this sea/storm god battle in the Baʿal Cycle more closely groups with other versions found from Egypt and Anatolia (which may be termed "Version A"), whereas the Israelite and Babylonian versions group with each other (which may be termed "Version B"). The ancestral version of the two versions has the following general sequence:

1. The sea god seeks kingship over the other gods.
2. The storm and sea gods battle each other, and the storm god is victorious.
3. The storm god is enthroned.
4. A palace is erected for the storm god.

Version B is distinguished with its placement of a creation narrative after the victory of the storm god. Version A on the other hand (including the Baal Cycle) has additional elements between (1) and (2), where the sea god seeks to exact tribute from the other gods, followed by an attempt from the grain goddess to appease the storm god, finally followed by the grain goddess attempting to seduce the storm god.

The closing hymn of the Baʿal Cycle, on the sixth and final tablet, has been related by Ayali-Darshan to the genre of Sumerian and Akkadian disputation poems.

== Reception ==
Some have contended that the contest between Baʿal and Yam is a prototype for the vision recorded in the 7th chapter of the Biblical Book of Daniel. Others have related the sequence of eschatological events in Revelation 21:1–4 (death of the Sea, coming of the city of heaven to earth, and the final defeat of Death) to the narrative progression of the Baal Cycle (Baal's victory over the Sea god Yam, his heavenly enthronement in his palace, and his battles against Mot, the underworld god).

== Translations ==
=== Complete translations ===
- Ginsberg's 1969 translation in the volume Ancient Near Eastern Texts Relating to the Old Testament.
  - Available.
- Coogan's 1978 translation in Stories from ancient Canaan

=== Partial translations ===
- Tablets 1 and 2 (KTU 1.1–1.2):
  - Mark Smith, The Ugaritic Baal Cycle: Volume 1, Brill, 1994.
- Tablets 3 and 4 (KTU 1.3–1.4):
  - Mark Smith and Wayne Pitard, The Ugaritic Baal Cycle: Volume 2, Brill, 2009.
