= Ugaritic texts =

Corpus of ancient cuneiform texts discovered in Syria

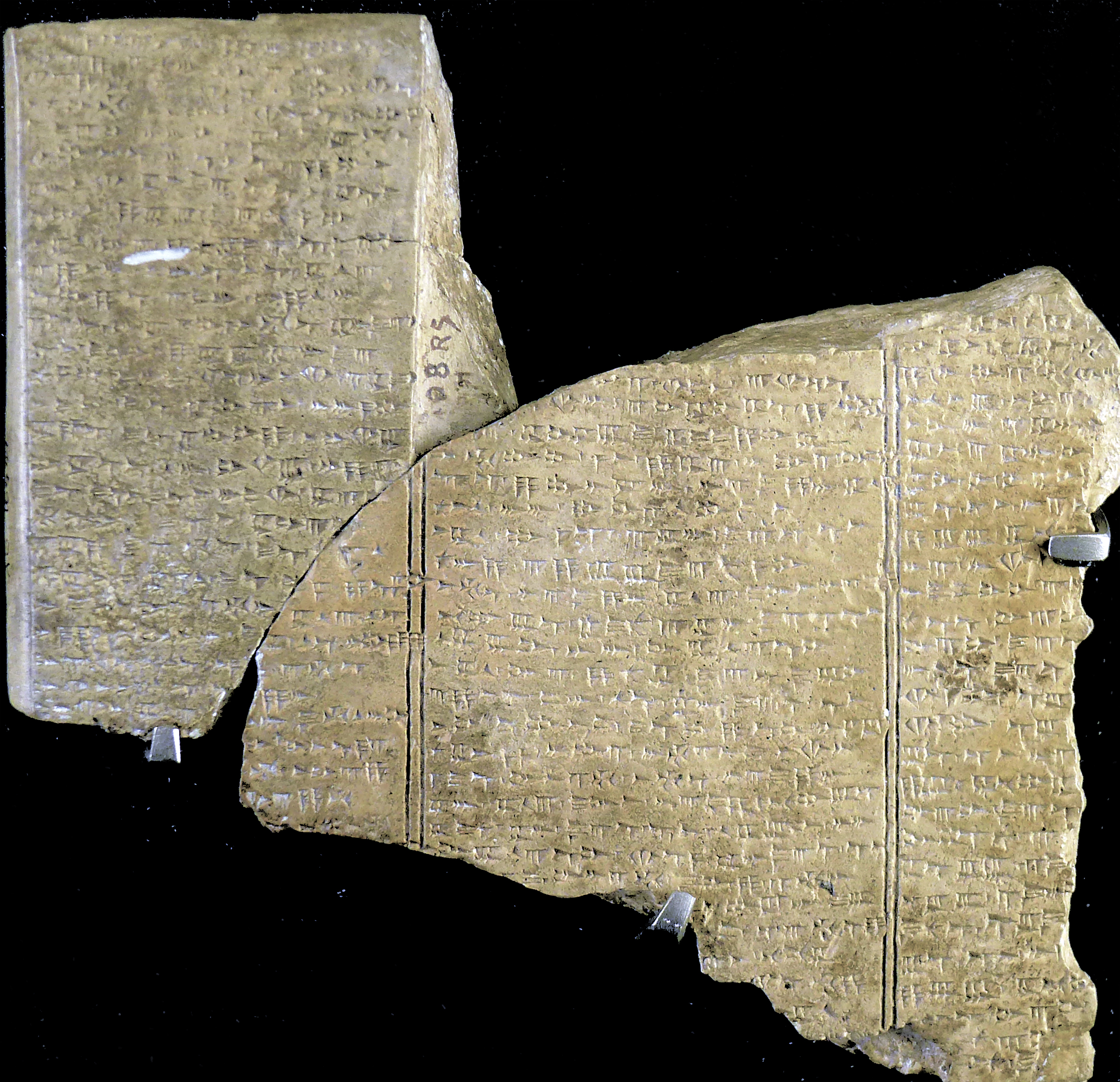
The Baal Cycle, the most famous of the Ugaritic texts, displayed in the Louvre

The Ugaritic texts are a corpus of ancient cuneiform texts discovered in 1928 in Ugarit (Ras Shamra) and Ras Ibn Hani in Syria, and written in Ugaritic, an otherwise unknown Northwest Semitic language. Approximately 1,500 texts and fragments have been found to date. The texts were written in the 13th and 12th centuries BCE.

The most famous of the Ugarit texts are the approximately fifty epic poems; the three major literary texts are the Baal Cycle, the Legend of Keret, and the Tale of Aqhat. The other texts include 150 tablets describing the Ugaritic cult and rituals, 100 letters of correspondence, a very small number of legal texts (Akkadian is considered to have been the contemporary language of law), and hundreds of administrative or economic texts.

Unique among the Ugarit texts are the earliest known abecedaries, lists of letters in alphabetic cuneiform, where the canonical order of the later Phoenician script is evidenced and mirrored by other alphabetical orders such as that of the Hebrew, Greek and Latin alphabets. The lesser-known alphabetical order used in Ethiopia today was also found at Ugarit.

Other tablets found in the same location were written in other cuneiform languages (Sumerian, Hurrian and Akkadian), as well as Egyptian and Luwian hieroglyphs, and Cypro-Minoan.

== Archaeology ==
=== Initial discovery ===
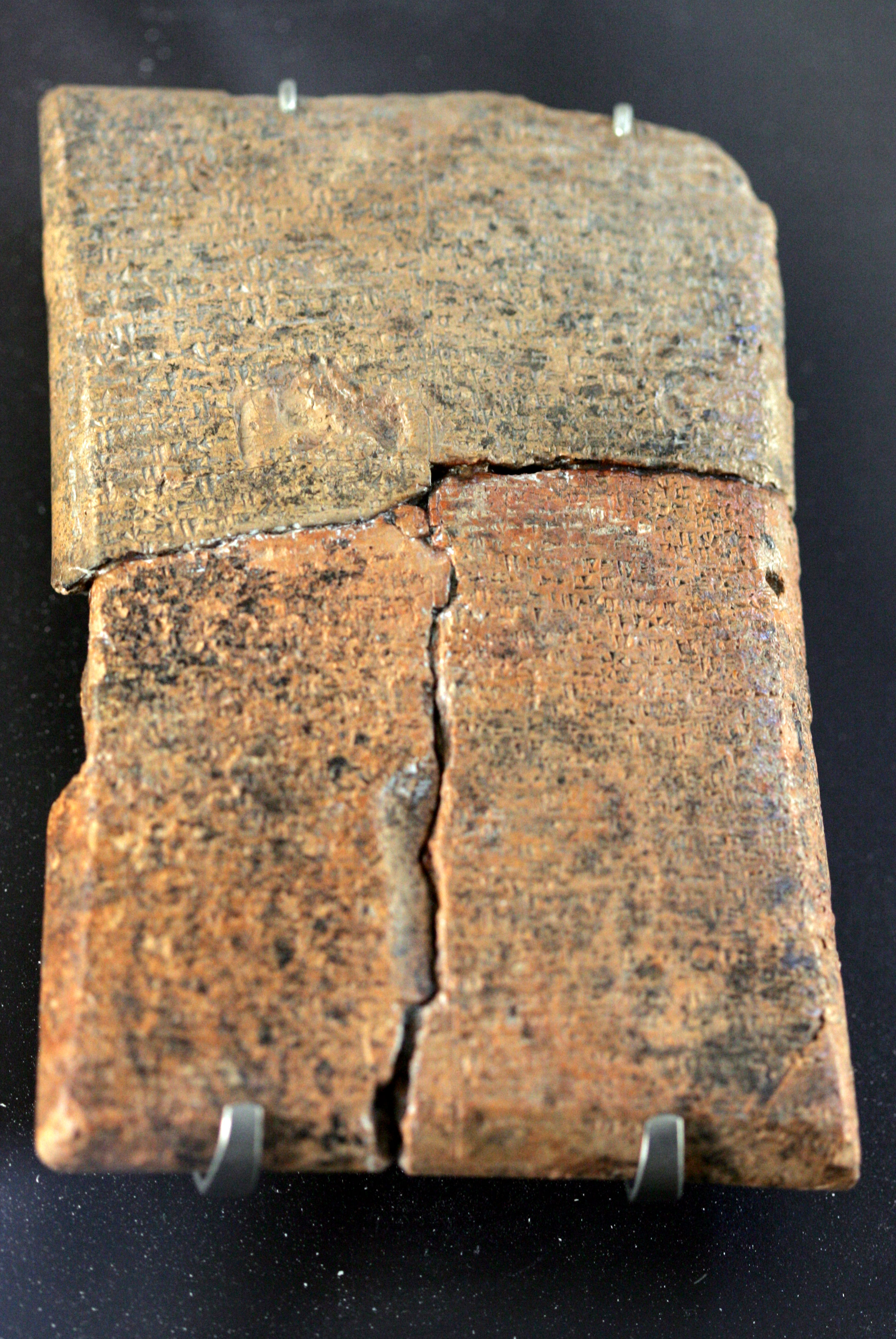
The Danel epic, in the Louvre

On excavation of the city of Ugarit, found accidentally in 1928–29 at Ras Shamra, Syria, several deposits of cuneiform clay tablets were found; all dating from the last phase of Ugarit before its destruction in the widespread Late Bronze Age collapse, around 1200 BCE. The texts were found to be written in an otherwise unknown Northwest Semitic language. Other tablets found in the same location were written in other cuneiform languages (Sumerian, Hurrian and Akkadian), as well as Egyptian and Luwian hieroglyphs, and Cypro-Minoan.

The tablets were found in a palace library, a temple library and—apparently unique in the world at the time—two private libraries, one belonging to a diplomat named Rapanu. The libraries at Ugarit contained diplomatic, legal, economic, administrative, scholastic, literary and religious texts.

=== 1958 excavations ===
During excavations in 1958, yet another library of tablets was uncovered. These were, however, sold on the black market and not immediately recovered. The "Claremont Ras Shamra Tablets" are now housed at the Institute for Antiquity and Christianity, School of Religion, Claremont Graduate University, Claremont, California. They were edited by Loren R. Fisher in 1971.

=== 1973 excavations ===
After 1970, succeeding Claude Schaeffer were Henri de Contenson, followed by Jean-Claude Margueron, Marguerite Yon, then Yves Calvet and Bassam Jamous, who since 2005 has held the office of Director General of Antiquities and Museums. In 1973, an archive containing around 120 tablets was discovered during rescue excavations.

=== 1994 excavations ===
In 1994 more than 300 further tablets dating to the end of the Late Bronze Age in the Near East were discovered within a large ashlar masonry building.

== Religious texts ==
Religious texts can be classified at first, into two types, Mythological/literary and Ritual texts, with the first being noted as a theological "universe" in which intends to give answers to the faithful relating to the metaphysical questions and concerns of the religious. With the ritual texts presenting a more "functional" side of such religion. Some texts of the mythological realm of the religion are the Baalu-Anatu Cycle (KTU 1.1-1.6), The Stars (KTU 1.23-1.24), and the tale of Aqhat.

== Baalu-Anatu Cycle ==
The Baalu-Anatu cycle (KTU 1.1- 1.6) details the fight of three deities (that being Baalu, Yammu, and Motu) pre-eminence under the primordial deity El, With the story heavily dependent on seasonal cycles. The story was believed to be passed down generation to generation until written down by Illimiku, a scribe of the time. Baalu in this story is also noted as a protagonist as he is victorious among the two gods The mythological epic also reveals power dynamics in Ugaritic religion as we learn that the El assumes the creator role and is characterized as an old god (ab adm).

=== Notable texts ===
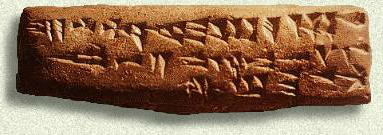
An abecedarium scribal exercise in the Ugaritic alphabet

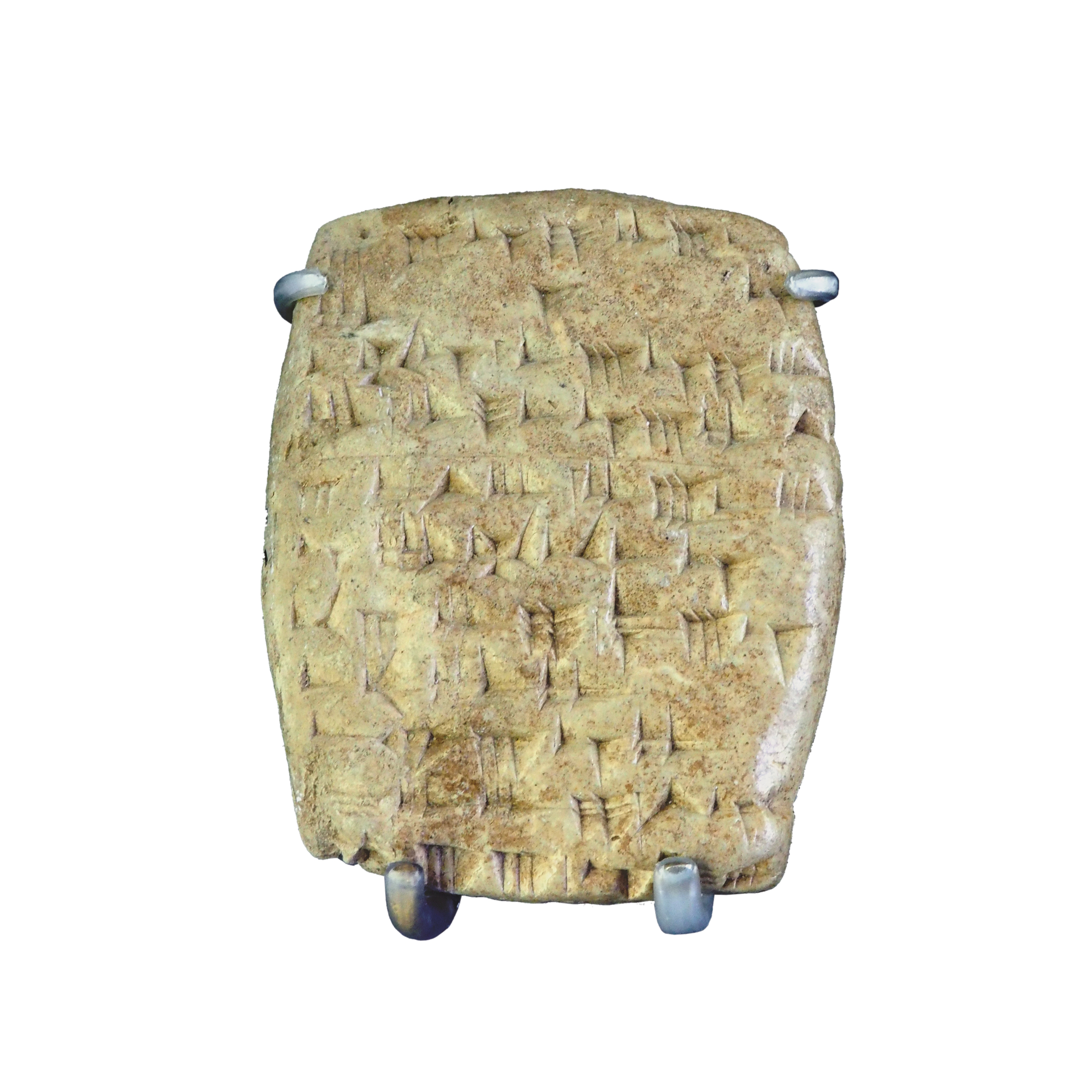
A letter in Ugaritic

Approximately 1,500 texts and fragments have been found to date, all of which have been dated to the 13th and 12th centuries BCE. The most famous of the Ugarit texts are the approximately fifty epic poems. The most important literary document recovered from Ugarit is arguably the Baal Cycle, describing the basis for the religion and cult of the Canaanite Baal; the two other particularly well known texts are the Legend of Keret and the Tale of Aqhat. The other texts include 150 tablets describing the Ugaritic cult and rituals, 100 letters of correspondence, a very small number of legal texts (Akkadian is considered to have been the contemporary language of law), and hundreds of administrative or economic texts. Some other tablets include scribal exercises; some of them are unique for being the earliest known abecedaries, lists of letters in alphabetic cuneiform.

The tablets have been used by scholars of the Hebrew Bible to clarify Biblical Hebrew texts and have revealed ways in which the cultures of ancient Israel and Judah found parallels in the neighboring cultures. The tablets reveal parallels with Israelite practices described in the Bible; for example, Levirate marriage, giving the eldest son a larger share of the inheritance, and redemption of the first-born son were practices common to the people of Ugarit as well.

== See also ==
- Amarna letters
- Ebla tablets
- Mari Tablets
- Emar tablets
- Hittite texts

== Sources ==
- Manfried Dietrich; Oswald Loretz; Joaquín Sanmartín (1995). The Cuneiform alphabetic texts: from Ugarit, Ras Ibn Hani and other places ("CAT"). Ugarit-Verlag. – the second edition (and the first in English) of the standard collection of Ugaritic texts
- Manfried Dietrich (1976). Die keilalphabetischen Texte aus Ugarit: einschließlich der keilalphabetischen Texte außerhalb Ugarits ("KTU"). Butzon & Bercker. – the first edition of the standard collection of Ugaritic texts
- Huehnergard, John (2012). An Introduction to Ugaritic. Hendrickson Publishers. ISBN 978-1-59856-820-2.
- Schniedewind, William; Hunt, Joel H. (2007). A Primer on Ugaritic: Language, Culture and Literature. Cambridge University Press. ISBN 978-1-139-46698-1.
