= Baal =

Semitic title often used in reference to deities

Baal 𐎁𐎓𐎍
- God of fertility, weather, rain, wind, lightning, seasons, war, sailors
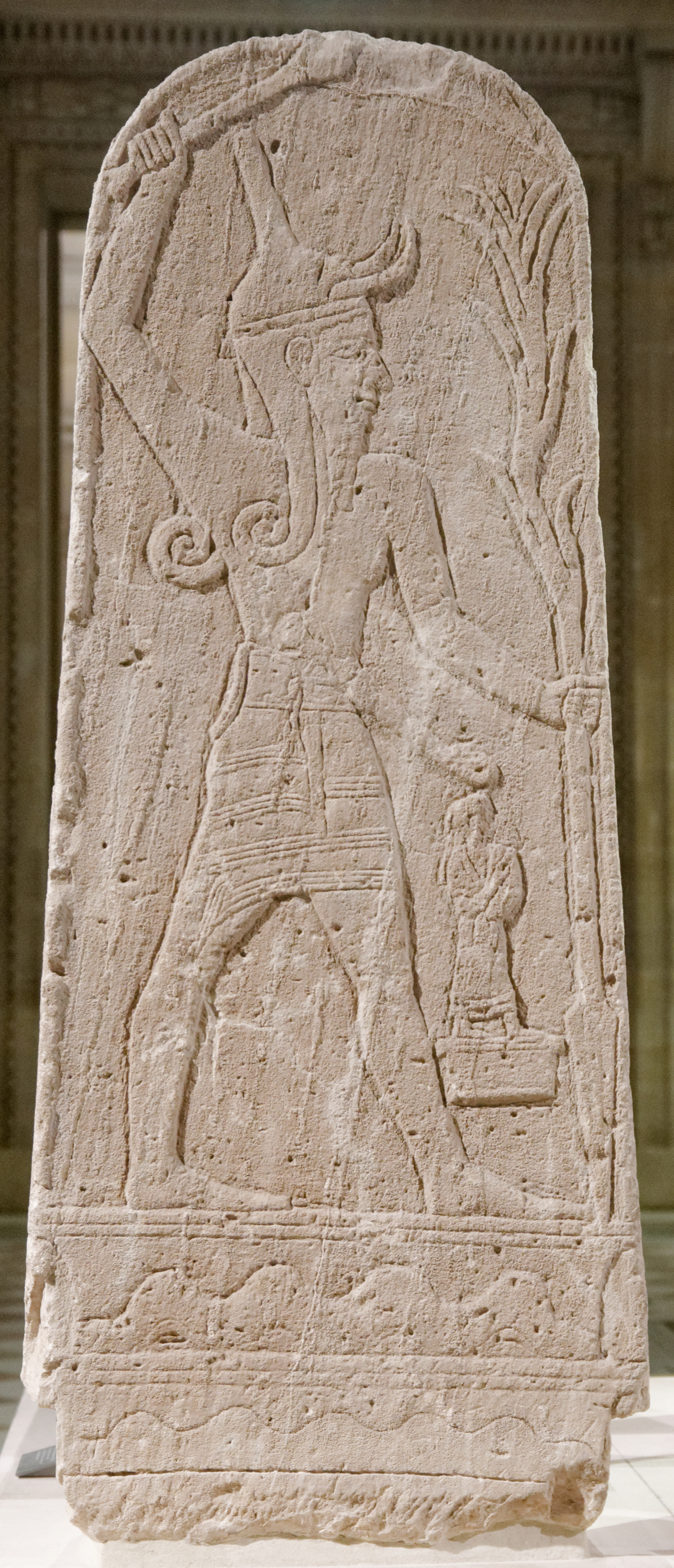
- Baal with Thunderbolt stele from Ugarit (Musée du Louvre, Paris)
- Planet: Jupiter
- Symbol: Bull, ram, thunderbolt
- Region: Phoenicia; Ancient Syria, especially Halab; Near, around and at Ugarit; Canaan; North Africa; Middle Kingdom of Egypt

Genealogy
- Parents: Dagan and Shalash (in Syria); El and Asherah (in some Ugaritic texts)
- Siblings: Hebat (in Syrian tradition), Anat
- Consorts: possibly Anat and Astarte
- Offspring: Pidray, Tallay, Arsay

Equivalents
- Greek: Zeus
- Aramaean and Mesopotamian: Hadad
- Hurrian: Teshub
- Arabic: Hubal
- Egyptian: Set (due to being a foreign god in Egypt, since Set was the god of foreigners – otherwise Baal Zephon, equivalent to Baʿal Hadad, was also equated with Horus)

Baal (/ˈbeɪ.əl, ˈbɑːl/), or Ba'al (/bɑː.ɑːl/), (Note: Ugaritic: 𐎁𐎓𐎍, romanized: baʿlu; Phoenician: 𐤁𐤏𐤋, romanized: baʿl; Biblical Hebrew: בעל, romanized: baʿal, pronounced [baʕal].) was a title and honorific meaning "owner" or "lord" in the Northwest Semitic languages spoken in the Levant during antiquity. From its use among people, it came to be applied to gods. Scholars previously associated the theonym with solar cults and with a variety of unrelated patron deities, but inscriptions have shown that the name Baal was particularly associated with the storm and fertility god Hadad and his local manifestations. The Ugaritic god Baal (𐎁𐎓𐎍) is the protagonist of one of the lengthiest surviving epics from the ancient Near East, the Baal Cycle.

Known by epithets like "rider of the clouds" and "Victorious Baal", he was associated with rain, lightning, wind, fertility, and kingship, and was often depicted in opposition to sea and death deities like Yammu and Mot. Worship of Baal spread throughout the Levant, Egypt, and the Mediterranean via Phoenician colonization, with regional forms such as Baal Hammon in Carthage. The god was also known as "the mighty one", and "the one without equal" ("there is none above him").

The Quran references Ba'al worship, portraying him as a false god opposed by the prophet Elijah (Arabic: Ilyās or Elyas) (Qur’an 37:125). The Quran also mentions Ba'al as a common noun meaning “husband” (Qur’an 2:228, 4:128, 11:72, 24:31). In Levantine Arabic, Arḍ Ba'al (Ba'al land) refers to rain-fed land that relies purely on natural rainfall rather than artificial irrigation.

The Hebrew Bible includes use of the term in reference to various Levantine deities, often with application towards Hadad, who was decried as a false god. In the Hebrew Bible, Baal appears frequently as a foreign or rival deity, with prophets like Elijah opposing his cult, while in early Israelite contexts, the title may have sometimes referred to Yahweh. Depiction as a false god was taken over into Christianity and Islam, sometimes under the form Beelzebub in demonology. Classical sources rendered him as Belus.

Ba'al (בעל) is the most commonly used Modern Hebrew word for a husband.

== Name ==
=== Epithets ===
Baʻal's widely used epithet is "rider (or mounter) of the clouds". (rkb ʿrpt, cf. rkb bʿrbt in Ps. 68:4; Ugaritic rkb ʿrpt.) These are related to Zeus's "gatherer of the clouds" and Yahweh's "rider of the heavens". Like the English word ride, rkb has equine and sexual uses.

=== Etymology ===
The spelling of the English term "Baal" derives from the Greek Báal (Βάαλ) which appears in the New Testament and Septuagint, and from its Latinized form Baal, which appears in the Vulgate. These forms in turn derive from the vowel-less Northwest Semitic form bʿl (Phoenician and Punic: 𐤁𐤏𐤋). The word's biblical senses as a Phoenician deity and false gods generally were extended during the Protestant Reformation to denote any idols, icons of the saints, or the Catholic Church generally. In such contexts, it follows the anglicized pronunciation and usually omits any mark between its two As. In close transliteration of the Semitic name, the ayin is represented, as Baʿal.

In the Northwest Semitic languages—Ugaritic, Phoenician, Hebrew, Amorite, and Aramaic—the word baʿal signified "owner" and, by extension, "lord", a "master", or "husband". Cognates include the Akkadian Bēlu (𒂗), (Note: This cuneiform is identical to the ⟨ 𒂗 ⟩ which is taken as EN in Sumerian texts. There, it has the meaning 'high priest' or 'lord' and appears in the names of the gods Enki and Enlil.) Amharic bal (ባል), and Arabic baʿl (بعل). Báʿal (בַּעַל) and baʿl still serve as the words for "husband" in modern Hebrew and Arabic respectively. They also appear in some contexts concerning the ownership of things or possession of traits.

The feminine form is baʿalah (Hebrew: בַּעֲלָה; Arabic: بَعْلَة), meaning "mistress" in the sense of a female owner or lady of the house and still serving as a rare word for "wife".

Suggestions in early modern scholarship also included comparison with the Celtic god Belenus, however this is now widely rejected by contemporary scholars.

== Semitic religion ==
=== Generic ===
Like En in Sumerian, the Akkadian bēlu and Northwest Semitic baʿal (as well as its feminine form baʿalah) was used as a title of various deities in the Mesopotamian and Semitic pantheons. Only a definitive article, genitive or epithet, or context could establish which particular god was meant.

=== Hadad ===
Baʿal was also used as a proper name by the third millennium BC, when he appears in a list of deities at Abu Salabikh. Most modern scholarship asserts that this Baʿal—usually distinguished as "The Lord" (הבעל, Ha-Baʿal)—was identical with the storm and fertility god Hadad; it also appears in the form Baʿal Haddu. Scholars propose that, as the cult of Hadad increased in importance, his true name came to be seen as too holy for any but the high priest to speak aloud and the alias "Lord" ("Baʿal") was used instead, as "Bel" was used for Marduk among the Babylonians and "Adonai" for Yahweh among the Israelites. A minority propose that Baʿal was a native Canaanite deity whose cult was identified with or absorbed aspects of Adad's. Regardless of their original relationship, by the 1st millennium BC, the two were distinct: Hadad was worshiped by the Aramaeans and Baʿal by the Phoenicians and other Canaanites.

=== Baʿal ===
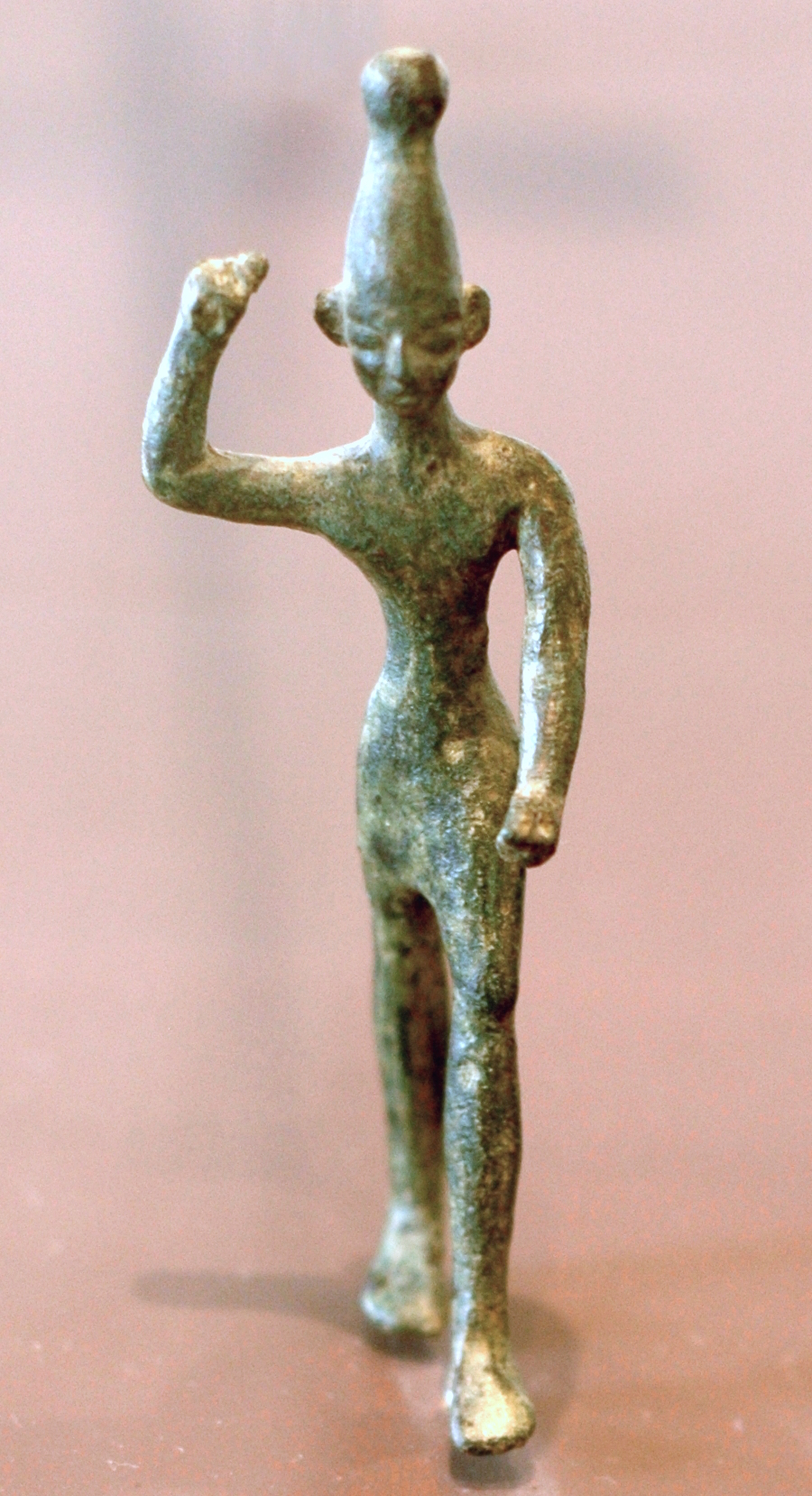
Bronze figurine of Baal, 14th–12th century BC, found at Ras Shamra (ancient Ugarit) near the Phoenician coast (Musée du Louvre, Paris)

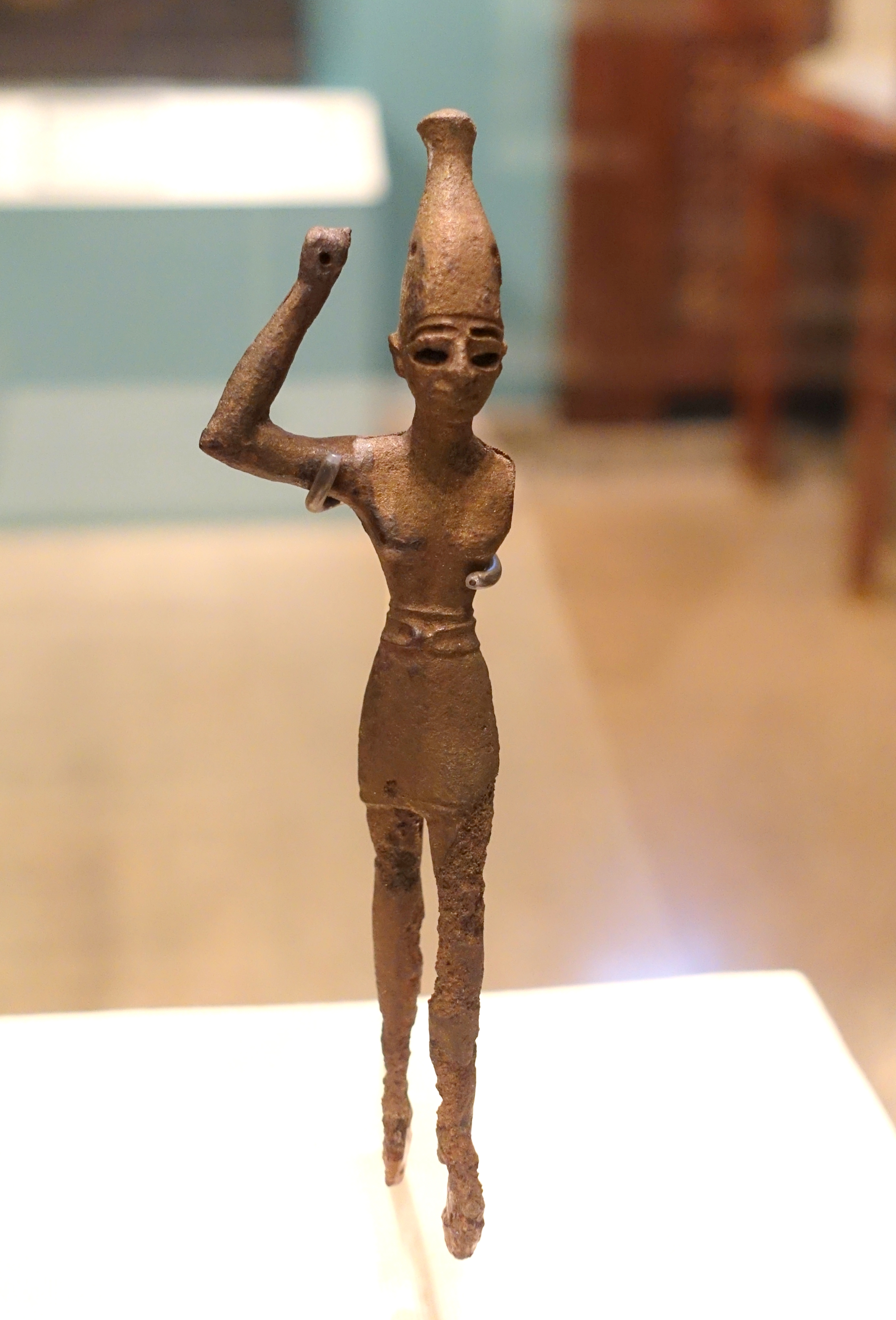
Solid cast bronze of a votive figurine representing Baal discovered at Tel Megiddo, dating to the mid-2nd millennium BC (Institute for the Study of Ancient Cultures, Chicago, Illinois)

Baʿal is well-attested in surviving inscriptions and was popular in theophoric names throughout the Levant but he is usually mentioned along with other gods, "his own field of action being seldom defined". Nonetheless, Ugaritic records show him as a weather god, with particular power over lightning, wind, rain, and fertility. (Note: In surviving accounts, Baʿal's power over fertility extends only over vegetation. Older scholarship claimed Baʿal controlled human fertility as well but did so on the basis of misinterpretation or of inscriptions now regarded as dubious. Similarly, 19th-century scholarship treating Baal as a personification of the sun seems to have been badly taken. The astrotheology of Near Eastern deities was an Iron Age development long postdating the origin of religion and, following its development, Bel and Baʿal were associated with the planet Jupiter. The sun was worshipped in Canaan as either the goddess Shapash or the god Shamash.) The dry summers of the area were explained as Baʿal's time in the underworld, and his return in autumn was said to have caused the storms that revived the land. Thus, the worship of Baʿal in Canaan—where he eventually supplanted El as the leader of the gods and patron of kingship—was connected to the region's dependence on rainfall for its agriculture, unlike Egypt and Mesopotamia, which focused on irrigation from their major rivers. Anxiety about water availability for crops and trees increased the importance of his cult, which focused attention on his role as a rain god. He was also called upon during battle, showing that he was thought to intervene actively in the world of man, unlike the more aloof El. The Lebanese city of Baalbeck was named after Baal. Alternatively, Ba' al is a divine co-regent with El, where El was the executive while Ba' al was the sustainer of the cosmos.

The Baʿal of Ugarit was the epithet of Hadad, but as time passed, the epithet became the god's name while Hadad became the epithet. Baʿal was usually said to be the son of Dagan, but appears as one of the sons of El in Ugaritic sources. (Note: Herrmann argues against seeing these separate lineages literally, instead proposing that they describe Baʿal's roles. As a god, he is understood as a child of El, "father of gods", while his fertility aspects connect him to the grain god Dagan.) Both Baʿal and El were associated with the bull in Ugaritic texts, as they symbolized both strength and fertility. He held special enmity against snakes, both on their own and as representatives of Yammu (lit. "Sea"), the Canaanite sea god and river god. He fought the Tannin (Tunnanu), the "Twisted Serpent" (Bṯn ʿqltn), "Lotan the Fugitive Serpent" (Ltn Bṯn Brḥ, the biblical Leviathan), and the "Mighty One with Seven Heads" (Šlyṭ D.šbʿt Rašm). (Note: The account is patchy and obscure here. Some scholars take some or all of the terms to refer to Litan, and in other passages, ʿAnat takes credit for destroying the monsters on Baʿal's behalf. Herrmann takes "Šalyaṭu" as a proper name rather than translating it as the "powerful one" or "tyrant".) Baʿal's conflict with Yammu is now generally regarded as the prototype of the vision recorded in the 7th chapter of the biblical Book of Daniel. As vanquisher of the sea, the Canaanites and Phoenicians regarded Baʿal as the patron of sailors and sea-going merchants. As vanquisher of Mot, the Canaanite death god, he was known as Baʿal Rāpiʾuma (Bʿl Rpu) and regarded as the leader of the Rephaim (Rpum), the ancestral spirits, particularly those of ruling dynasties.

From Canaan, worship of Baʿal spread to Egypt by the Middle Kingdom and throughout the Mediterranean following the waves of Phoenician colonization in the early 1st millennium BC. He was described with diverse epithets, and before Ugarit was rediscovered, these were supposed to refer to distinct local gods. However, as explained by Day, the texts at Ugarit revealed that they were considered "local manifestations of this particular deity, analogous to the local manifestations of the Virgin Mary in the Roman Catholic Church". In those inscriptions, he is frequently described as "Victorious Baʿal" (Aliyn or Ảlỉyn Baʿal), "Mightiest one" (Aliy or ʾAly) (Note: This name appears twice in the Legend of Keret discovered at Ugarit. Before this discovery, Nyberg had restored it to the Hebrew texts of Deuteronomy, 1 & 2 Samuel, Isaiah, and Hosea. Following its verification, additional instances have been claimed in the Psalms and in Job.) or "Mightiest of the Heroes" (Aliy Qrdm), "The Powerful One" (Dmrn), and in his role as patron of the city "Baʿal of Ugarit" (Baʿal Ugarit). As Baʿal Zaphon (Baʿal Ṣapunu), he was particularly associated with his palace atop Jebel Aqra (the ancient Mount Ṣapānu and classical Mons Casius). He is also mentioned as "Winged Baʿal" (Bʿl Knp) and "Baʿal of the Arrows" (Bʿl Ḥẓ). Phoenician and Aramaic inscriptions describe "Baʿal of the Mace" (Bʿl Krntryš), "Baʿal of the Lebanon" (Bʿl Lbnn), "Baʿal of Sidon" (Bʿl Ṣdn), Bʿl Ṣmd, "Baʿal of the Heavens" (Baʿal Shamem or Shamayin), Baʿal ʾAddir (Bʿl ʾdr), Baʿal Hammon (Baʿal Ḥamon), Bʿl Mgnm.

=== Baʿal Hammon ===
Baʿal Hammon was worshipped in the Tyrian colony of Carthage as their supreme god. It is believed that this position developed in the 5th century BC following the severing of its ties to Tyre following the 480 BC Battle of Himera. Like Hadad, Baʿal Hammon was a fertility god. Inscriptions about Punic deities tend to be rather uninformative, though, and he has been variously identified as a moon god and as Dagan, the grain god. Rather than the bull, Baʿal Hammon was associated with the ram and depicted with his horns. The archaeological record seems to bear out accusations in Roman sources that the Carthaginians burned their children as human sacrifices to him. He was worshipped as Baʿal Karnaim ("Lord of the Two Horns"), particularly at an open-air sanctuary at Jebel Bu Kornein ("Two-Horn Hill") across the bay from Carthage. His consort was the goddess Tanit.

The epithet Hammon is obscure. Most often, it is connected with the NW Semitic ḥammān ("brazier") and associated with a role as a sun god. Renan and Gibson linked it to Hammon (modern Umm el-‘Amed between Tyre in Lebanon and Acre in Israel) and Cross and Lipiński to Haman or Khamōn, the classical Mount Amanus and modern Nur Mountains, which separate northern Syria from southeastern Cilicia.

== Judaism ==
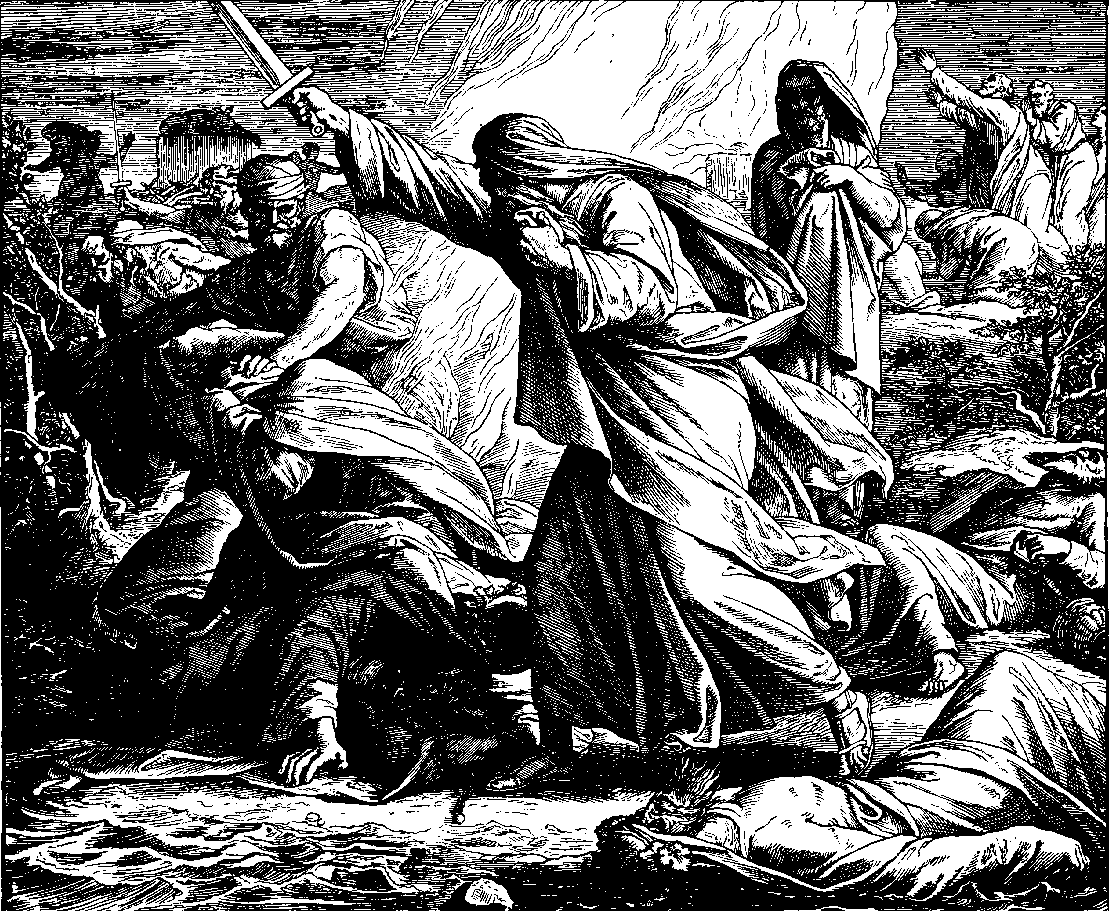
Slaughter of the Prophets of Baal, 1860 woodcut by Julius Schnorr von Karolsfeld

Baʿal (בַּעַל) appears about 90 times in the Hebrew Bible in reference to various gods. The priests of the Canaanite Baʿal are mentioned numerous times, most prominently in the First Book of Kings. Many scholars believe that this describes Jezebel's attempt to introduce the worship of the Baʿal of Tyre, Melqart, to the Israelite capital Samaria in the 9th century BC. Against this, Day argues that Jezebel's Baʿal was more probably Baʿal Shamem, the Lord of the Heavens, a title most often applied to Hadad, who is also often titled just Baʻal.

1 Kings 18 records an account of a contest between the prophet Elijah and Jezebel's priests. Both sides offered a sacrifice to their respective gods: Baʻal failed to light his followers' sacrifice while Yahweh's heavenly fire burnt Elijah's altar to ashes, even after it had been soaked with water. The observers then followed Elijah's instructions to slay the priests of Baʿal, after which it began to rain, showing Yahweh's mastery over the weather.

Other references to the priests of Baʿal describe their burning of incense in prayer and their offering of sacrifice while adorned in special vestments.

=== Yahweh ===
The title baʿal was a synonym in some contexts of the Hebrew adon ("Lord") and adonai ("My Lords") still used as aliases of the Lord of Israel Yahweh. According to some scholars, the early Hebrews did use the names Baʿal ("Lord") and Baʿali ("My Lord") in reference to the Lord of Israel, just as Baʿal farther north designated the Lord of Ugarit or Lebanon. This occurred both directly and as the divine element of some Hebrew theophoric names. However, according to others it is not certain that the name Baal was definitely applied to Yahweh in early Israelite history. The component Baal in proper names is mostly applied to worshippers of Baal, or descendants of the worshippers of Baal. Names including the element Baʿal presumably in reference to Yahweh include the judge Gideon (also known as Jerubaʿal, lit. "The Lord Strives"), Saul's son Eshbaʿal ("The Lord is Great"), and David's son Beeliada ("The Lord Knows"). The name Bealiah ("The Lord is Jah"; "Yahweh is Baʿal") combined the two. However John Day states that as far as the names Eshbaʻal, Meribaʻal, and Beeliada (that is, Baʻaliada), are concerned it is not certain whether they simply allude to the Canaanite god Baʻal, or are intended to equate Yahweh with Baʻal, or have no connection to Baʻal.

It was the program of Jezebel, in the 9th century BC, to introduce into Israel's capital city of Samaria her Phoenician worship of Baal as opposed to the worship of Yahweh that made the name anathema to the Israelites.

At first the name Baal was used by the Jews for their God without discrimination, but as the struggle between the two religions developed, the name Baal was given up by the Israelites as a thing of shame, and even names like Jerubbaal were changed to Jerubbosheth: Hebrew bosheth means "shame".

Eshbaʿal became Ish-bosheth and Meribaʿal became Mephibosheth, but other possibilities also occurred. Gideon's name Jerubaʿal was mentioned intact but glossed as a mockery of the Canaanite god, implying that he strove in vain. Direct use of Baʿali continued at least as late as the time of the prophet Hosea, who reproached the Israelites for doing so.

Brad E. Kelle has suggested that references to cultic sexual practices in the worship of Baal, in Hosea 2, are evidence of an historical situation in which Israelites were either giving up Yahweh worship for Baal, or blending the two. Hosea's references to sexual acts being metaphors for Israelite "apostasy".

Brian P. Irwin argues that "Baal" in northern Israelite traditions is a form of Yahweh that was rejected as foreign by the prophets. In southern Israelite traditions, "Baal" was a god that was worshipped in Jerusalem. His worshippers saw him as compatible or identical with Yahweh and honored him with human sacrifices and fragrant meal offerings. Eventually, the Chronicler(s) disapproved of both "Baals" whilst the Deuteronomists used "Baals" for any god they disapproved of.

Likewise, Mark S. Smith believes Yahweh was more likely to be inspired by Baal rather than El, since both are stormy divine warriors and lack the pacifistic traits of El according to the Ugaritic texts and Hebrew Bible.

=== Baʿal Berith ===
Baʿal Berith ("Lord of the Covenant") was a god worshipped by the Israelites when they "went astray" after the death of Gideon according to the Hebrew Scriptures. The same source relates that Gideon's son Abimelech went to his mother's kin at Shechem and received 70 shekels of silver "from the House of Baʿal Berith" to assist in killing his 70 brothers from Gideon's other wives. An earlier passage had made Shechem the scene of Joshua's covenant between all the tribes of Israel and "El Yahweh, our god of Israel" and a later one describes it as the location of the "House of El Berith". It is thus unclear whether the false worship of the "Baʿalim" being decried is the worship of a new idol or rites and teachings placing Yahweh as a mere local god within a larger pantheon. The Hebrew Scriptures record the worship of Baʿal threatening Israel from the time of the Judges until the monarchy. However, during the period of Judges such worship seems to have been an occasional deviation from a deeper and more constant worship of Yahweh:

Throughout all the stories of Judges the popular faith in YHWH runs as a powerful current. This faith raises the judges, and inspires poets, prophets, and Nazirites. ... Worship of Baals and Ashtoreths has been schematically interspersed between these chapters, but no trace of a vital, popular belief in any foreign gods can be detected in the stories themselves. Baal prophets appeared in Israel centuries later; but during the age of the judges when Israel is supposed to have been most deeply affected by the religion of Canaan, there are no Baal priests or prophets, nor any other intimation of a vital effect of polytheism in Israel’s life.

The Deuteronomist and the present form of Jeremiah seem to phrase the struggle as monolatry or monotheism against polytheism. Yahweh is frequently identified in the Hebrew scriptures with El Elyon, however, this was after a conflation with El in a process of religious syncretism. ’El (Hebrew: אל) became a generic term meaning "god", as opposed to the name of a worshipped deity, and epithets such as El Shaddai came to be applied to Yahweh alone, while Baal's nature as a storm and weather god became assimilated into Yahweh's own identification with the storm. In the next stage the Yahwistic religion separated itself from its Canaanite heritage, first by rejecting Baal-worship in the 9th century, then through the 8th to 6th centuries with prophetic condemnation of Baal, sun-worship, worship on the "high places", practices pertaining to the dead, and other matters.

=== Beelzebub ===
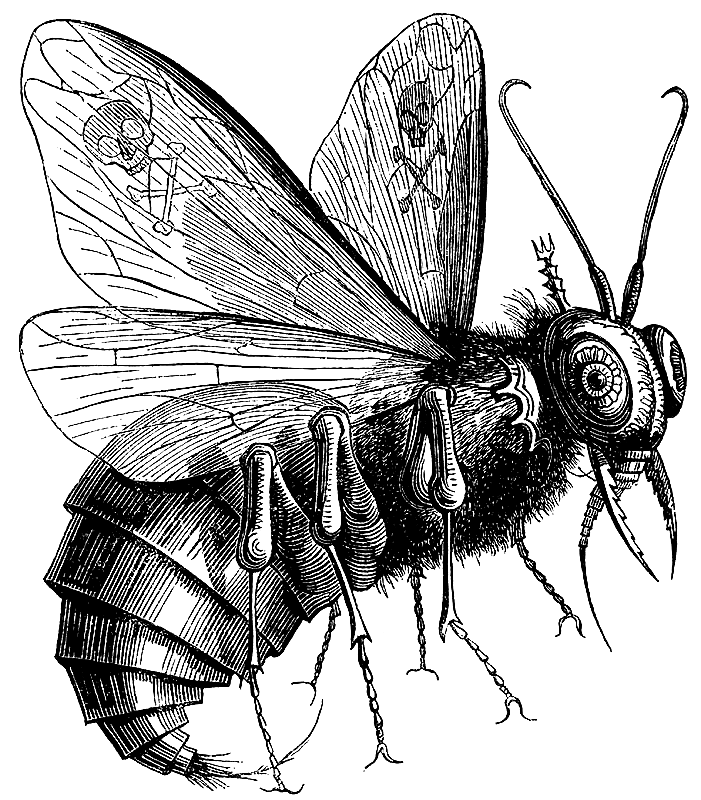
"Beelzebub" in the 1863 edition of Jacques Collin de Plancy's Dictionnaire Infernal

Baʿal Zebub (Hebrew: בעל זבוב, lit. "Fly-Lord") (Note: "The etymology of Beelzebul has proceeded in several directions. The variant reading Beelzebub (Syriac translators and Jerome) reflects a long-standing tradition of equating Beelzebul with the Philistine deity of the city of Ekron mentioned in 2 Kgs 1:2, 3, 6, 16. Baalzebub (Heb ba˓al zĕbûb) seems to mean “lord of flies” (HALAT, 250, but cf. LXXB baal muian theon akkarōn, “Baal-Fly, god of Akkaron”; Ant 9:2, 1 theon muian).") occurs in the first chapter of the Second Book of Kings as the name of the Philistine god of Ekron. In it, Ahaziah, king of Israel, is said to have consulted the priests of Baʿal Zebub as to whether he would survive the injuries from his recent fall. The prophet Elijah, incensed at this impiety, then foretold that he would die quickly, raining heavenly fire on the soldiers sent to punish him for doing so. Jewish scholars have interpreted the title of "Lord of the Flies" as the Hebrew way of calling Baʿal a pile of dung and his followers vermin, although others argue for a link to power over causing and curing pestilence and thus suitable for Ahaziah's question. The Septuagint renders the name as Baälzeboúb (βααλζεβούβ) and as "Baʿal of Flies" (βααλ μυιαν, Baäl muian). Symmachus the Ebionite rendered it as Beëlzeboúl (Βεελζεβούλ), possibly reflecting its original sense. (Note: Arndt & al. reverse this, saying Symmachus transcribed Baälzeboúb for a more common Beëlzeboúl.) This has been proposed to have been B‘l Zbl, Ugaritic for "Prince Baal". (Note: "It is more probable that b‘l zbl, which can mean “lord of the (heavenly) dwelling” in Ugaritic, was changed to b‘l zbb to make the divine name an opprobrius epithet. The reading Beelzebul in Mt. 10:25 would then reflect the right form of the name, a wordplay on “master of the house” (Gk oikodespótēs).") (Note: "An alternative suggested by many is to connect zĕbûl with a noun meaning '(exalted) abode.'") (Note: "In contemporary Semitic speech it may have been understood as ‘the master of the house’; if so, this phrase could be used in a double sense in Mt. 10:25b.")

== Classical sources ==
Outside of Jewish and Christian contexts, the various forms of Baʿal were indifferently rendered in classical sources as Belus (Ancient Greek: Βῆλος, Bē̂los). An example is Josephus, who states that Jezebel "built a temple to the god of the Tyrians, which they call Belus"; this describes the Baʿal of Tyre, Melqart. Herrmann identifies the Demarus/Demarous figure mentioned by Philo Byblius as Baʿal.

Baʿal Hammon, however, was identified with the Greek Cronos and the Roman Saturn as the Zabul Saturn. He was probably never equated with Melqart, although this assertion appears in older scholarship.

== Christianity ==
Beelzebub or Beelzebul was identified by the writers of the New Testament as Satan, "prince" (i.e., king) of the demons. (Note: "In NT Gk. beelzeboul, beezeboul (Beelzebub in TR and AV) is the prince of the demons (Mt. 12:24, 27; Mk. 3:22; Lk. 11:15, 18f.), identified with Satan (Mt. 12:26; Mk. 3:23, 26; Lk. 11:18).") (Note: "Besides, Matt 12:24; Mark 3:22; Luke 11:15 use the apposition ἄρχων τῶν δαιμονίων ‘head of the →Demons’.")

John Milton's 1667 epic Paradise Lost describes the fallen angels collecting around Satan, stating that, though their heavenly names had been "blotted out and ras'd", they would acquire new ones "wandring o're the Earth" as false gods. Baalim and Ashtaroth are given as the collective names of the male and female demons (respectively) who came from between the "bordering flood of old Euphrates" and "the Brook that parts Egypt from Syrian ground".

== Islam ==
The Quran mentions that Prophet Elias (Elijah) warned his people against Baʿal worship.

And Elias was indeed one of the messengers. ˹Remember˺ when he said to his people, “Will you not fear ˹Allah˺? Do you call upon ˹the idol of˺ Ba’l and abandon the Best of Creators— Allah, your Lord and the Lord of your forefathers?” But they rejected him, so they will certainly be brought ˹for punishment˺. But not the chosen servants of Allah. We blessed him ˹with honourable mention˺ among later generations: “Peace be upon Elias.” Indeed, this is how We reward the good-doers. He was truly one of Our faithful servants.

— Quran 37:123-132

According to some medieval Islamic scholars, the context of the verse above tells of Ilyas and the inhabitants of the town of Baalbek who worshipped Baal.

According to Tabari, baal is a term used by Arabs to denote everything which is a lord over anything.

Al-Thaʿlabī offers a more detailed description about Baal; accordingly it was an idol of gold, twenty cubits tall, and had four faces.

The trilateral root, (bā, ayn, lam) baʿl occurs seven times in the Qur’an with its common Semitic usage of “owner, husband,” particularly husband. For example, Sarah, wife of Abraham refers to her husband using the term.

== Modern-day ==
=== Conspiracy theories ===
On January 30, 2026, the United States Department of Justice (DOJ) released a portion of the Epstein files that mention the word "Baal". Some online claims attach the worship of Baal to satanic rituals and the occult, and link it to allegations involving American financer and child sex offender Jeffrey Epstein; however, the released materials provide no clear evidentiary basis for that inference. The appearance is said to be consistent with financial-document field text and, in at least one widely circulated example, appears to be an optical character recognition (OCR) or scanning artifact in which "Bank Name" is misread as "Baal. name".

=== Burning of Baal effigies ===
On February 11th 2026, during the yearly celebration of the Iranian Revolution anniversary in Iran, at 11:33 AM (resembling the masonic holy numbers), several effigies of Baal along with several obelisks were set to fire simultaneously in several cities in Iran. They were made of natural rubber and cardboard days before the Performance. These words were said before performing the act:

“We, the monotheists of the world, by the help of God, will bring down the worshipers of Baal, the worshipers of Satan, and the arrogant oppressors.”

This act was said by its performers to symbolise how Muslims reject demon Gods and their worshippers and to also note that even though paganism and worshipping of demons and idols is believed publicly to be forfeit, many top leaders, especially in the west, still practice it.

A month later, on 13th March 2026 Shi'ite Muslims burned an effigy of Baal bearing Israeli symbols during a gathering marking the annual Quds Day (Jerusalem Day) in Baghdad, Iraq.

== See also ==
- Adonis
- Bael
- Beelzebub
- Baal (disambiguation)
- Baal in popular culture
- Baal the demon
- Baalahs
- Baʿal Peʿor (Lord of Mt Peʿor)
- Baal-zephon (Lord of Mount Zaphon)
- Bel
  - Temple of Bel
- Beluses
- Belial
- Set
- Teshub
  - Theispas
