= Anat =

Ancient Mesopotamian, Ugaritic and Egyptian war goddess

- Goddess of war and hunting
- Depiction of Anat with a Spear, Shield and Atef Crown
- Other names: Ḫanat
Name in hieroglyphs
a n ti i t H8 I12
- Major cult center: Ḫanat, Ugarit, Tanis
- Symbol: Atef Crown, wings
- Parents: El and Asherah (in Ugarit); Ra or Ptah (in Egyptian tradition)
- Consort: Baal, Hadad (in Ugarit; disputed); Set (Ancient Egyptian religion; disputed)

Equivalents
- Greek: Athena
- Mesopotamian: Ninurta

Anat (/ˈɑːnɑːt/, /ˈænæt/), Anatu, classically Anath (/ˈeɪnəθ, ˈeɪˌnæθ/; Ugaritic: 𐎓𐎐𐎚 ʿnt; Hebrew: עֲנָת ʿĂnāṯ; Phoenician: 𐤏𐤍𐤕, romanized: ʿNT; Greek: Αναθ, romanized: Anath; Egyptian: ꜥntjt) was a goddess associated with warfare and hunting, best known from the Ugaritic texts. Most researchers assume that she originated in the Amorite culture of Bronze Age upper Mesopotamia, and that the goddess Ḫanat, attested in the texts from Mari and worshiped in a city sharing her name located in Suhum, should be considered her forerunner.

In Ugarit, Anat was one of the main goddesses, and regularly received offerings, as attested in texts written both in the local Ugaritic language and in Hurrian. She also frequently appears in myths, including the Baal Cycle and the Epic of Aqhat. In the former, she is portrayed as a staunch ally of the weather god Baal, who assists him in his struggle for kingship, helps him with obtaining the permission to obtain a dwelling of his own, and finally mourns and avenges his death at the hands of the personified death, Mot. The precise nature of the relation between Anat and Baal is uncertain, and the conventional views that they were lovers, siblings or both remain a matter of dispute among researchers. Another deity who frequently appears alongside her is Ashtart. Interactions between Anat and the sun goddess Shapash and moon god Yarikh are described in myths as well. In Hurrian ritual texts, she appears alongside deities such as Šimige, Aštabi and Nupatik. Elsewhere in the Levant and in nearby regions of inland Syria, Anat's status apparently was not equally high, though she is nonetheless attested in Emar, Hazor and elsewhere.

At some point in time in the Bronze Age, either during the reign of Hyksos or shortly after its end, Anat was introduced to Egypt, and achieved a degree of prominence during the reign of Ramesses II, whose devotion to her is well attested. Evidence for Egyptian worship of Anat is also available from various sites in Canaan which were controlled by the pharaohs in the Bronze Age. She remained a part of the Egyptian pantheon as late as in the Roman period. In the first millennium BCE, she also continued to be worshiped in Suhum in Mesopotamia. She is also attested in a number of Phoenician inscriptions. Most of them come from Cyprus. They indicate that on this island an association developed between her and the Greek goddess Athena based on their similar character. References to the goddess Anat in the Hebrew Bible are limited and uncertain, with most scholars agreeing they appear only vestigially in theophoric names and place names.

Anat was characterized as a fertility goddess associated with human sexuality in early scholarship, but despite the occasional modern support, this view is no longer the consensus among experts. Proposed etymologies of her name and interpretations of texts she appears in are a subject of criticism. The view that goddesses of Ugarit and other nearby areas were interchangeable and had no individual traits, which often shaped early publications about Anat, is also no longer accepted.

== Origin ==
According to Wilfred G. Lambert, Anat should be identified with the goddess Ḫanat (a transcription without the breve below the first consonant, Hanat, is also in use) known from the texts from Mari, and originally worshiped further south, in Suhum. While Jean-Marie Durand argues against this connection, and his view has also been adopted by Lluís Feliu, Lambert's theory has been accepted by a number of other researchers, including Wilfred G. E. Watson, Gebhard J. Selz, Volkert Haas and Daniel Schwemer. Multiple Assyriologists, including Andrew R. George and Julia M. Asher-Greve, outright refer to the goddess from Suhum, still worshiped there in later periods, simply as Anat, and it has been pointed out that her name, while originally rendered as Ḫanat in documents pertaining to this area, is written as an-at in inscriptions of local origin from the first millennium BCE.

In the light of Lambert's theory, Anat, like her presumed forerunner Ḫanat, would be an Amorite deity in origin.

Multiple etymologies of Anat's name have been proposed. While none have been conclusively proven, the view it is a cognate of the Arabic word ‘anwat, "force" or "violence," is considered plausible. Peggy L. Day notes that this proposal and the view that Anat and Ḫanat are analogous "dovetail" each other. Lambert assumed that Ḫanat's name could refer to the Ḫanaeans (Ḫana), an Amorite group. Similarly, Durand derives it from ḫana, which he considers to be a label analogous to Bedouin. However, Ḫanat's homonymous cult center apparently was not located in the lands considered the territory of the Ḫanaeans.

=== Older theories ===
A number of proposals regarding the origin of Anat's name are no longer considered plausible in modern scholarship due to relying entirely on incorrect past evaluations of her character. One such example is Ariella Deem's suggestion that it was derived from a purely hypothetical root *’nh, "to make love." While in the past scholarship Anat was described as a "patroness of wanton love," or as a "fertility goddess," these views started to be challenged in scholarly publications in the 1990s and are no longer accepted today by most researchers. Sometimes similar labels can nonetheless be found even in more recent publications.

Jo Ann Hackett notes that the connection between fertility and female deities has been historically exaggerated in the studies of religions of the Ancient Near East and considers such a characterization an example of perceiving women "in terms of biological functions" formed largely based on contemporary speculation, rather than on the available ritual texts and other primary sources. Julia M. Asher-Greve notes this category is one of the examples of terms which should be considered "innovations of early modern work in the study of comparative religion" rather than an accurate reflection of religion in antiquity. It has been pointed out by other authors that in Anat's case, alleged references to a connection with fertility depend on dubious translations of hapax legomena and filling of lacunae. According to Theodore J. Lewis, one such attempt is Edward Lipiński's treatment of the text KTU 1.96, meant to present her as a sexually active "fertility" goddess Michael C. Astour remarked critically that Lipiński's translation explained "practically every noun by 'penis'" to accomplish this. More recent research revealed that the text does not mention Anat at all.

== Ḫanat in the Mari texts ==
The worship of Ḫanat is well attested in texts from Old Babylonian Mari. She was particularly venerated in the land of Suhum, where a city named Ḫanat (later Anat) was located. Its name could be written with the dingir sign preceding it (^{d}Ḫa-na-at^{ki}, Bit ^{d}Ḫa-na-at^{ki}), which indicates it was directly named after the goddess. It has been identified with modern Anah in Iraq. One of the Mari texts mentions a temple of Ḫanat, presumed to be located in the city named after her. Later documents from Suhum indicate that a temple dedicated to the local goddess bore the ceremonial Sumerian name E-šuzianna, "house, true hand of heaven." The tradition of assigning such names of houses of worship originated in southern Mesopotamia among the Sumerians and Akkadians, but it outlived the decline of Sumerian as a vernacular language, and spread to other areas within the Mesopotamian cultural sphere, including Assyria and the basin of the Diyala River in the north, the kingdom of Mari and the city of Harran in the west and to a smaller degree Elam in the east. Hammurabi of Babylon patronized the temples of the city of Ḫanat according to a later inscription of Ninurta-kudurri-usur, son of the local ruler Šamaš-reš-uṣur known from a stele found in Babylon.

In an offering list from the reign of Zimri-Lim, Ḫanat appears as the recipient of two sheep. The same document lists a number of other deities worshiped in Mari, such as Numushda, Ishara and Ninkarrak. Oil offerings to Ḫanat were apparently made by women from the royal palace. She is the last of the eight deities mentioned in a list presumed to document this custom. The formula "Dagan and Ḫanat are well" occurs in a letter from Buqāqum, a royal official active in Ḫanat. A legal text mentions that a certain Pulsī-Addu from Sapīratum (a settlement in Suhum) after losing a lawsuit meant to establish the ownership of a patch of land was obliged to swear an oath by a group of deities including Ḫanat, as well as Dagan and Itūr-Mēr, and by king Zimri-Lim to guarantee that he will not attempt to press the same claims again. Ḫanat's presence in this text most likely simply reflects the fact that she was associated with the area which was the object of the conflict, while Dagan and Itūr-Mēr were respectively the head of the local pantheon and the god most commonly invoked in oaths.

Ḫanat is also mentioned in a letter from Šamaš-nasir, an official from Terqa, to Zimri-Lim, in which he relays an oracular declaration of Dagan to the king. Its subject is a verdict pronounced by the local god for Tishpak, the god of the kingdom of Eshnunna, after Yakrub-El relays to him that Ḫanat is threatened by the latter's actions. The interactions between the gods reflect the political situation of the period, with Dagan representing Mari and Yakrub-El and Ḫanat respectively Terqa and Suhum, while Tishpak stands for Eshnunna, whose troops presumably were a threat for the latter of the two dependencies of Zimri-Lim's kingdom.

Ḫanat appears in four types of theophoric names of women and ten types of names of men in the Mari texts. Some of the attested bearers of such names were deportees from the area roughly between Mount Abdulaziz and the Sinjar Mountains. A certain Ḫabdi-Ḫanat was at one point tasked with manufacturing a throne for Dagan in Mari itself. An individual bearing the name Ummi-Ḫanat is also attested outside this corpus, but it is presumed that the text, even though it mentions Eshnunna, pertains to Suhum.

== Anat in the Ugaritic texts ==
Anat was one of the main goddesses in the pantheon of Ugarit, a city located in the north of modern Syria on the Mediterranean coast whose religion was closely related to that of Mari. According to the Ugaritic texts, Anat resides on a mountain known under the name ‘Inbubu, whose location remains unknown. An association between her and Mount Saphon, while also known, is infrequently attested. In the standard Ugaritic list of deities, she is placed between Athirat and Shapash. In the analogous text written in syllabic cuneiform, her name is rendered as ^{d}a-na-tu_{4}.

In Ugarit Anat was regarded as a warrior goddess, though she was not the only deity cast in this role. She is described using both a sword and a bow. Additionally, sources such as KTU 1.114 and KTU 1.22 attest that she was portrayed as a huntress as well. However, Theodore J. Lewis points out that due to relying on an incorrect collation of the tablet KTU 1.96, a number of older publications overestimated the degree to which Anat was portrayed as belligerent by ascribing cannibalistic tendencies to her. Lewis' conclusion is also accepted by other researchers today. In reality, as discovered during the digitalization of Ugaritic texts currently stored in Damascus, the text does not mention the goddess at all, as it is not plausible that ‘nn is a mistake for ‘nt. The older reading was based not on inspection of the object itself, but rather on an old photo which from a modern perspective is "washed out and epigraphically useless." While the meaning of the rest of the text remains uncertain, Gregorio del Olmo Lete suggests that it might be an incantation against the casting of an evil eye (‘nn hlkt). This proposal is also accepted by Gebhard J. Selz.

It has been pointed out by multiple authors, including Peggy L. Day and Mark Smith, that the fact that Anat engages in pursuits which in Ugaritic culture were viewed as typically masculine, namely warfare and hunting, constitutes "gender inversion" of the roles human women were expected to take in society. Less formally, Dennis Pardee labeled her as a "tomboy goddess," a characterization also employed by Izak Cornelius. In response to her threat, El describes Anat so: "I know you, my daughter, that you are a manly sort, and that none are emotional as you."

It has been suggested that Anat was also regarded as a "mistress of animals," in part based on pendants from Ugarit showing a goddess depicted in the pose associated with this archetypal motif, but this view is not universally accepted.

Textual sources describe Anat as winged and capable of flight, which is commonly employed to identify possible depictions of her among the works of art from Ugarit. One possible example is a cylinder seal showing a winged goddess in a helmet decorated with horns and a knob, standing on a bull and holding a lion. However, it cannot be established with certainty that every winged goddess depicted on a seal found in modern Syria is necessarily Anat. It is possible that due to the influence of iconography of Mesopotamian Ishtar, other local goddesses could be depicted with wings too. Some researchers, among them Silvia Schroer, employ terms such as "Anat-Astarte type" when describing figures depicted in art to mitigate this problem.

=== Epithets ===
It has been postulated that the character of Ugaritic deities is well reflected in the epithets applied to them. In Anat's case the most frequently occurring one is btlt, which is also overall the second best attested divine epithet in the entire Ugaritic corpus, after ‘ali’yn b’l (aliyn Baal; "Baal the mighty"). As of 2008, it has been identified in a total of forty nine passages. Its exact translation was a subject of scholarly controversy in the past, though today it is most commonly rendered as "maiden" in English. Other proposals include "virgin," "girl" and "adolescent." However, it is now agreed that the term, even if translated as "virgin," does not refer to virginity in the modern sense, but simply designates her as young and nubile. The proposal that btlt had a more precise meaning, "young woman who did not yet bring forth male offspring," is considered baseless. An Akkadian cognate, batultu, occurs chiefly in legal contexts, and it has been pointed out that while it does refer to a woman's age, it appears to be used "without prejudice to her sexual or marital status." Aicha Rahmouni points out that while the Akkadian evidence does imply a woman referred to as a batultu would likely be expected to be chaste according to social norms of the period, there is no indication that Ugaritic deities were bound by identical norms. She proposes that the use of ardatum, similarly conventionally translated as "maiden" (in order to refer to various goddesses in Mesopotamia), offers a close semantic parallel.

A further well attested epithet of Anat is ybmt l’imm, known from ten passages, but there is no consensus regarding its translation. The element l’imm is usually interpreted as a common noun meaning "peoples" or "nations," though Dennis Pardee treats it as the name of a deity, analogous to Lim which is known from theophoric names from Mari. However, according to Alfonso Archi the element lim, while theophoric, should be treated simply as a religious understanding of the concept of the clan or similar traditional social structure. Its persistence in known sources might only reflect a pastoralist lifestyle (or memory of it) which relied on the social bonds denoted this way. References to Lim are uncommon in Ugaritic texts, and the presumed deity shows no apparent connection to Anat.

A single passage in the text KTU 1.108 refers to Anat as gṯr, possibly "the powerful." According to Rahmouni gṯr is most likely a scribal mistake for the feminine form gṯrt, while Dennis Pardee proposes that in this case it is an otherwise unattested noun, "power," instead of the adjective well known from other texts. An entire sequence of otherwise unknown epithets is listed in the following verses of the same tablet: "the mistress of kingship" (b’lt mlk), "the mistress of dominion" (b’lt drkt), "the mistress of the high heavens" (b’lt šmm rmm) and "the mistress of the kpṯ" (b’lt kpṯ), whose enumeration is a poetic parallelism and is meant to highlight the position and authority of the goddess in the local pantheon. The mlk-drkt word pair is also known from other poetic contexts. It has also been suggested that the parallelism of the terms drkt and šmm rmm might be reflected in the names Derketo and Semiramis known from late antique sources. Gebhard J. Selz remarks that despite one of these epithet associating her with the heavens, Anat was never regarded as an astral deity. Rahmouni suggests the word kpṯ is most likely a cognate of Akkadian kupšu, a type of headdress which is also mentioned in divine epithets. Gregorio del Olmo Lete instead argues that its probable meaning is "firmament", based on the parallel with šmm rmm, and that its Akkadian cognate would be kabāsu, "to trample." Rahmouni argues the latter proposal is improbable because parallel epithets do not need to be semantically analogous, and additionally because Ugaritic ṯ typically corresponds to Akkadian š, not s, making both the translation and the proposed cognate difficult to accept. This view is also supported by Dennis Pardee, who additionally remarks that Anat's association with the kpṯ, which he vocalizes as kupṯu, might mirror her link to the atef crown in Egyptian sources.

=== Worship ===
In an offering list described as "Sacrifice to the gods of Mount Saphon," which possibly documents rites which took place over the course of the two months following the winter solstice, ‘Iba’latu and Ḫiyyāru (roughly corresponding to the period between the 21st of December and the 20th of February according to Dennis Pardee), Anat is the recipient of rams, similar to many other deities listed, such as Shapshu, Arsay, Išḫara and Kinnaru. Another ritual text mentions the sacrifice of multiple bulls and rams to Anat. Additionally, a burnt offering of a bull and a ram to "Anat of Ṣaphon" is singled out near the end of the tablet. Anat of Saphon receives the same offering according to another source, listing the sacrifices made to her, as well as Ilib, El, Baal and Pidray, in the temple of Baal. In the same source she is also the recipient of a bull and a ram as a peace offering, in this passage appearing alongside Ilib, two Baals (of Ugarit and of Aleppo), Yarikh, Pidray and Dadmiš. In an entry ritual (an Amorite practice well known from Mari) of Ashtart, which took place over the course of multiple days, Anat received the snout and neck of an unidentified animal following the offerings of gold and silver to Shapash, Yarikh and Gaṯaru on the second day. However, there is no indication that the label Gaṯarūma (which appears to describe the other three deities) also applied to her.

Seventeen individuals bearing theophoric names invoking Anat have been identified in known Ugaritic texts, one among them being a king of nearby Siyannu. This makes her the second most popular goddess in that regard after Shapash, present in the names of sixty-six individuals. The element ʾilat ("goddess;" attested as an epithet of both Athirat and Anat) occurs more often, with a total of twenty-two attestations, but it is not certain if it refers to a specific deity. At the same time, Wilfred H. van Soldt remarked that Anat appears in theophoric names much less frequently than her importance in myths would indicate.

==== Hurrian ritual texts ====
Anat is also present in Hurrian offering lists from Ugarit, according to Daniel Schwemer, possibly because she had no close equivalent among the Hurrian deities, unlike other well-attested members of the local pantheon. In one of them, she receives a ram after Aštabi (a warrior god) and Šimige (the sun god). In another similar list she is instead preceded by Nupatik. She also appears in a Hurrian ritual dealing with the anointing of deities, which otherwise only mentions members of the Hurrian pantheon.

Texts from Ugarit attesting to the worship of Ugaritic deities such as Anat, alongside Hurrian ones, have been argued to indicate that the two traditions functionally merged and that the religious life of the city was "transcultural."

=== Attested and proposed associations with other deities ===
It is agreed that a close connection existed between Anat and Baal, but its nature continues to be disputed. Past scholarship is commonly criticized for speculation about her presumed status as his wife. No evidence exists for a spousal relationship between Anat and any other deity in the Ugaritic texts, while possible indications of sexual relations with other deities, or lack of them, are not interpreted uniformly. Daniel Schwemer accepts the possibility that individual texts might allude to sexual encounters between Baal and Anat, but concludes that the weather god "did not have a wife in any real sense." Mark Smith argues that while there is no direct evidence for these two deities being viewed as a couple in the Ugaritic texts, the matter should be left open due to the scarcity of sources and possible evidence from other Northwest Semitic-speaking areas (postdating the period covered by the Ugaritic corpus) and Egypt, though a skeptical approach should be retained. Regardless of Anat's relation to Baal, there is no evidence that she was ever regarded as the mother of his daughters attested in Ugartic tradition (Pidray, Tallay and Arsay). Ugaritic texts also refer to Anat to as Baal's sister, though Aicha Rahmouni notes that it has been called into question if they were envisioned as biologically related. She points out that there is evidence, including an epithet directly referring to that relation, that Baal was regarded as the son of Dagan, who never occurs in association with Anat. She is consistently called a daughter of El instead, with Athirat being presumed to be her mother. If the disputed role of Baal and Anat as lovers is accepted, the words "sister" and "brother" might be used in a figurative sense to refer to them in that capacity. It is also possible that all members of the Ugaritic pantheon were referred to as siblings in a less direct sense, as members of a single social group.

Ashtart frequently appears in Ugaritic texts alongside Anat, and the pairing of these two goddesses has been described as "fairly standard." An incantation against snakebite refers to them together as Anat-wa-Ashtart and states that both of them resided on the mountain Inbubu (inbb), otherwise associated only with Anat, while Ashtart was instead believed to dwell in Mari. Another similar text similarly invokes them together, after the pairs Baal and Dagan and Yarikh and Resheph. The importance of Ashtart is considered secondary compared to Anat in these sources and in the broader corpus of Ugaritic texts. However, Dennis Pardee stresses that while closely associated, the goddesses were not fused together.

The trilingual Sumero-Hurro-Ugaritic version of the Weidner god list from Ugarit treats Anat, whose name is repeated in both of the latter columns, as analogous to the Mesopotamian god Saĝkud, who belonged to the circle of either Ninurta or Anu. The name of this deity might be derived from an ordinary Sumerian noun, which possibly referred to a type of official, specifically a tax collector. Modern researchers often compare Anat to deities such as the Mesopotamian Inanna and Annunitum and the Hurrian Šauška. However, Jo Ann Hackett critically evaluated presenting the character of Anat and Inanna as identical.

It has been suggested that Ba’alat Bahatīma, "lady of the houses" (or "of the temple," "of the palace"), might be an epithet of Anat. However, it has also been proposed that she was a distinct deity. The meaning of the name was possibly analogous to Mesopotamian Belet Ekallim. Ba’alat Bahatīma might have also been a title of a different Ugaritic goddess, possibly Pidray or Athirat.

A further deity sometimes argued to be identical with Anat is Rahmay, known from KTU 1.23, a myth about Shahar and Shalim. However, evidence in favor of this theory is absent from any known Ugaritic texts.

A minor deity named ṯmq, who might correspond to Mesopotamian Sumuqan, is described as "warrior of Anat" (mhr ‘nt) in two passages.

=== Mythology ===
Anat appears in multiple Ugaritic myths, where she is typically portrayed as the main ally of Baal. Theodore J. Lewis based on these texts has characterized her as "without doubt the most vivid of the Ugaritic goddesses."

==== Baal Cycle ====
Anat is portrayed in her usual role in the Baal Cycle, a well known Ugaritic narrative poem preserved on the tablets KTU 1.1–6. Sometimes, labels such as Baal-Anat cycle are used to refer to this work.

Anat is first mentioned when El summons her to perform a ritual whose precise character is uncertain, but which according to John Gibson might have been meant to prevent her from actively supporting Baal. Later, when Yam, Baal's rival for the position of king of the gods, sends his messengers to the divine assembly, Anat and Ashtart prevent the weather god from harming them. She seizes his right hand (KTU 1.2 I 40), while the other goddess - seizes his left hand. This passage is one of the multiple identified examples of poetic parallelism, employing the names of Anat and Ashart side by side.

Subsequently Anat appears in the section of the story focused on Baal striving to be granted a permission to have a palace built for himself. She apparently confronts a human army in a passage which remains poorly understood. Afterwards, the messengers of Baal, Gapnu (also spelled Gupan) and Ugar, approach her, which makes her worried if a new enemy is challenging Baal's authority, prompting her to recall battles she took part in previously (KTU 1.3 III 36 - 47). Among the enemies she lists are Yam, listed twice (once under his main name and once as Nahar), Tunnanu (a sea serpent), further serpentine sea monsters (bṯn ‘qltn, "the twisting serpent" and šlyṭ d šb ‘t r’ašm, "the dominant one who has seven heads"), Arsh (‘arš; possibly also a sea monster), Atik (‘tk, the "calf of El" or alternatively the "divine calf," Ḏabību (ḏbb; described as a daughter of El and presumed to be demonic in character), and Ishatu ('išt, flame, a female demon described as dog-like, possibly representing a concept analogous to dogs of individual deities known from Mesopotamian god lists such as An = Anum). Wayne T. Pitard points out that the inclusion of Yam among Anat's defeated adversaries is difficult to explain, as a well known section of the narrative focuses on Baal, rather than her, defeating the sea god. According to Pitard, the reference might indicate the existence of a separate tradition which is otherwise not preserved in known texts.

After learning that the source of Baal's anguish is not a new enemy but the lack of his own dwelling, Anat disrespectfully attempts to pressure El to grant Baal the permission to have a palace built for himself (KTU 1.3 V 27–32). She fails in this effort. Subsequently she assists the latter god in convincing Athirat to act as a mediator on his behalf. On the way to the sea shore where Athirat can be found, they apparently discuss an event during which Baal was dishonored in some way, possibly by Yam. The details are unclear and parts of the text are missing. When Athirat notices that they are approaching, she reacts with fear or anger (KTU 1.4 II.12–21); the scene has been summarized as "a stereotyped response to bad news." However, her mood improves when she realizes that Anat and Baal bear gifts for her, and do not intend to smite her or any other deities. Anat asks her on Baal's behalf to implore El to grant the permission she was herself unsuccessful at obtaining earlier (KTU 1.4 III 33-36). She then seemingly joins Athirat and her servant Qodesh-wa-Amrur in their journey to El's dwelling. This interpretation has been questioned in the past, but the fact that Anat knows about the decision before Baal and later relays it to him is regarded as evidence in its favor. It is still possible that Anat is not present when the verdict itself is pronounced by El.

After Baal's death at the hands of Mot, Anat mourns him. She also shows concern about the fate of the people (KTU 1.6 I 6). Shapash, the sun goddess, is the first to notice her despair when she discovers the body of Baal, and helps her bring the deceased weather god to Mount Saphon for his burial. Afterwards, Anat announces Baal's death to El, who decides that it will be necessary to appoint a substitute king. She also remarks that the situation will make Athirat rejoice (KTU 1.6 I 39-43), either due to the presumed antagonism between her and Baal or because she will be able to display her authority by appointing a different god to fill his place. The surviving sections pose a problem for interpreters, as apparently even though Anat has previously buried Baal, she is actively looking for him afterwards. It has been suggested that she only buried a substitute, rather than the real Baal. When the story resumes after the coronation of a temporary king, Attar, followed by a large lacuna (estimated to be around 30 lines), Anat threatens Mot. She kills him, and subsequently threshes his remain with a blade, winnows them with a sieve, burns them in a fire, grinds them with a millstone, and finally scatters them for birds to eat. It has been argued that this scene reflected an annual agricultural ritual. According to John Gibson this is unlikely, as Anat's actions are simply meant to illustrate that the destruction of Mot was complete and thorough.

In a later section of the myth, when El learns in a dream that Baal is alive, he tells Anat to call Shapash to look for him. The sun goddess reassures Anat that she will try to find him, and receives a blessing in return. The rest of the column is missing. In the final surviving fragment of the text, which establishes that Baal gained El's favor and his position was no longer threatened, Anat is mentioned by Mot (resurrected after their earlier confrontation)), who complains to the weather god about his treatment at her hands.

==== Epic of Aqhat ====
Another long Ugaritic narrative work, the Epic of Aqhat (KTU 1.17-19), also features Anat, though for the most part it focuses on humans rather than gods. Many details of the plot are uncertain due to the state of preservation of the tablets. The eponymous character is the son of a legendary king, Danel. At an early point in the narrative, Danel's son receives a bow from the craftsman god Kothar-wa-Khasis. Anat apparently desires to obtain it and asks the human to give it to her, but she is rebuked. It is not clear if Aqhat's reaction to her demand (ht tṣdn tỉnṯt; KTU 1.17 VI 40) should be interpreted as a question ("now do womenfolk hunt?") or an ironic remark ("now womenfolk hunt!"). Anat demands permission to punish him for what she perceives as impiety from El, which the senior god grants her. She invites Aqhat to a hunt, but in secret she orders a certain Yatipan (described as a "Sutean warrior") to kill him. However, as a result of his assault the bow is broken, which enrages Anat further. Aqhat's body is subsequently devoured by birds of prey, and unnamed messengers inform Danel that Anat is complicit in his disappearance. The rest of the narrative apparently deals with Aqhat's burial and the revenge of his sister Pughat against Yatipan, who at one point mistakes her for Anat and starts boasting about his recent endeavors. Surviving fragments indicate that Anat herself does not face repercussions.

==== Other myths ====
Due to the presence of the word btlt, which is a very common epithet of Anat, it has been proposed that a verse from Epic of Keret (KTU 1.15 II 27) refers to her as a wetnurse of Yaṣṣib, the eponymous king's son, but the name of the goddess is only a restoration of a lacuna. In the past, it was proposed that Shapash or one of the Kotharat might be meant instead. Steve A. Wiggins calls the evidence mustered in favor of the former view "compelling," and notes that the only problem is the lack of other texts where the sun goddess is described as a btlt. The same composition is also one of the texts attesting that Anat was regarded as beautiful. Comparisons to her appearance could be employed to praise the beauty of literary characters, in this case Huray, a mortal princess. The term usually employed to highlight this quality of Anat is n’mt, a superlative form of n’m, which can mean "good" or "beautiful" depending on context. This term was also applied to the moon god Yarikh (n’mn ‘lm, "most handsome of the gods;" n’mn is the masculine form of the same word).

Anat appears alongside Ashtart in KTU 1.114. During a banquet organized by El, Yarikh, who in this composition behaves like a dog, possibly due to engaging in alcohol consumption, receives pieces of meat from her and Ashtart. The goddesses are subsequently rebuked by a nameless servant of El, who complains that they offer choice cuts of meat to a dog. Anat and Ashtart are also referenced again in one of the final lines of the tablet. According to Mark Smith's interpretation,. the reference presumably indicates that they are seeking the ingredients needed to cure El's hangover caused by his drunkenness. The drunkenness is described in the same myth.

== Egyptian reception ==
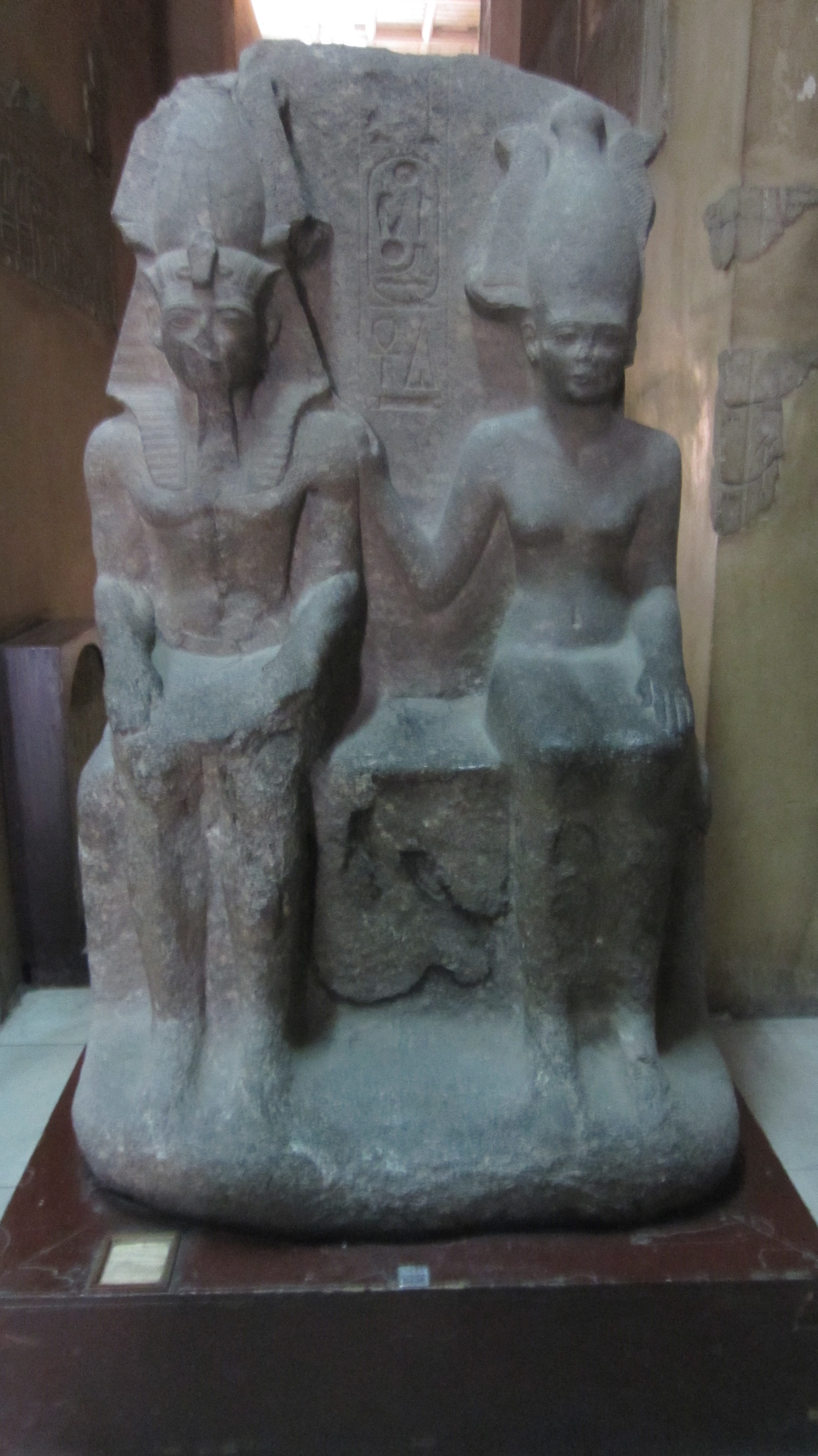
A statue of Anat and Ramesses II from Tanis.

It is commonly assumed that Anat was introduced to Egypt by the Hyksos, who settled there during the Second Intermediate Period. They ruled the Nile Delta for approximately one century, with Avaris serving as their capital. Richard H. Wilkinson cites the name of the ruler Anat-her as evidence for the Hyksos worshiping Anat. However, according to Christiane Zivie-Coche, the attestations of this goddess tied to the Hyksos are limited to a single theophoric name. She suggests that available evidence instead indicates that foreign deities from the north, such as Anat, only came to be commonly worshiped in Egypt during the subsequent reign of the Eighteenth Dynasty. She proposes that recovering the former Hyksos territory increased the frequency of interactions with various cultures of the Mediterranean coast and the broader Ancient Near East, among them Ugarit. This in turn led to more foreign influences finding their way into Egyptian religion, culture and language. As of 2011, there was no material evidence for the presence of Anat in religious contexts before the reign of Ramesses II. Other deities sharing her origin, such as Resheph and Haurun, had already appeared in records dating further back, to the times of Amenhotep II.

The double divine name Anat-Ya'u is found in Papyrus Amherst 63 and here near Anat-Bethel in Arthur Cowley's Elephantine, 1923, page 304

In the past, it was often argued that the worshipers of foreign deities were chiefly prisoners of war brought to Egypt, but textual sources instead indicate that the pharaohs, the clergy of Ptah and ordinary citizens could all be involved in their veneration. Two temples dedicated to Anat have been identified in Egypt, one in Tanis (part of the temple complex of Mut) and another as the Temple of Hibis in the Kharga Oasis. The Egyptians also built a temple dedicated to her in Beisan during the reign of Ramesses III. Izak Cornelius additionally lists a festival of Anat celebrated in Gaza alongside the attestations connected to the Egyptian reception of this goddess It is known from an Egyptian ostracon dated to the thirteenth century BCE, a copy of a letter from a scribe named Ipuy to a certain Bak-en-amun, a garrison host commander. It describes the state of affairs in the area under his supervision, but details of the festival of Anat are not preserved. While a further Egyptian artifact presumed to come from Gaza is connected to the worship of Anat, it might not be authentic. It is a situla mentioning Anat in an inscription. Egyptian theophoric names invoking her are also known, one example being Anat-em-heb, "Anat in her festival", constructed in an analogous way to similar names invoking native deities such as Amun or Horus.

Anat is characterized as warlike in Egyptian sources, similar to Ugarit. She was also called "the mistress of heaven." It has been argued that this title might be related to her epithet known from the Ugaritic text KTU 1.108, b’lt šmm rmm, 'mistress of the high heavens.' In visual arts, she was portrayed wearing the atef, a type of crown associated with Upper Egypt, and wielding either a spear and a shield, a fenestrated battle axe, or possibly the was-scepter. However, this utensil is better attested in association with Ashtart. It has been pointed out that ancient Egyptians typically depicted deities introduced from other areas according to local norms, and their attributes more directly reflected their character rather than their origin.

The pharaoh Ramesses II was particularly devoted to Anat, according to Wilkinson, because of her warlike character. He referred to himself as the "beloved" of this goddess and called her his mother. His inscriptions generally assign warlike traits to her rather than motherly ones. A statue from his reign depicts Anat with her hand placed on his shoulder. It comes from a temple located in Tanis. Both the goddesses and the pharaoh are identified in an accompanying inscription. He also named one of his daughters (Bint-Anat, "daughter of Anat"), his war hound ("Anat is strength") and his sword after the goddess. One of his successors, Ramesses III, referred to Anat as the goddess responsible for protecting him in battle.

Anat retained her role in the Egyptian pantheon through the first millennium BCE, up to the period of Roman rule. She is also among the deities depicted in the Dendera Temple complex from the Roman period. She also appears on a stele in Greco-Roman style alongside Khonsu and Mut.

=== Anat, Ashtart and Qetesh ===
The association between Anat and Ashtart is well attested in Egypt, and it is presumed that it was a direct adaptation of northern ideas about these two goddesses. Both of them could be regarded as daughters of Ra or Ptah. However, they are not always explicitly described as sisters. The myth Contest of Horus and Set for the Rule, dated to the period of the New Kingdom, is assumed to refer to both Anat and Astarte as prospective brides of Set. This interpretation has been questioned in Egyptology since the 1970s. Objections to the translation were also raised in Ugaritic studies: Neal H. Walls suggested in 1992 that interpreting this text might involve a misunderstanding. According to Mark Smith, as of 2014, no evidence has been provided to settle the academic dispute in favor of this view.

Anat and Ashtart appear alongside a third goddess, Qetesh, in the inscription on the so-called "Winchester College stele", which depicts only one figure, despite three names being listed. This object has been used to argue that Qetesh, like the other two deities, had to be a major goddess in a similar area of ancient Syria. In particular, attempts were made to identify her with Athirat based on the incorrect view that she, Anat, and Ashtart were the three major goddesses of Ugarit. This theory disregards the position of Shapash in the city's pantheon. Additionally, while Anat and Ashtart do appear together in Ugarit, there is no parallel group that would also include Athirat. A different proposal is to treat the three goddesses equally. However, Peggy L. Day points out that before the Hellenistic period, there is no other evidence for the merging of Anat with other goddesses in the Egyptian tradition. The evidence is limited to this single work of art, which she considers to be unusual. Christiane Zivie-Coche rejects the view that Qetesh was a hypostasis of Anat (or Ashtart), or even a goddess of Syrian origin at all. She instead agrees with the proposal that Qetesh was a goddess who developed in Egypt, even though her name is derived from a root known from Semitic languages, qdš. Izak Cornelius characterizes the importance assigned to the stela in past scholarship as "exaggerated". Additionally, as early as 1955, at the time of its original publication, it has been pointed out that the inscription would indicate that the author was not fully familiar with the hieroglyphic script. This led Cornelius to tentatively propose that the inscription might be a forgery. The provenance of the stela remains unknown, and it is now lost.

== Other Bronze Age attestations ==
Anat was worshiped in Emar, a city located on the banks of the Euphrates in modern Syria, though her importance there was small, especially in comparison with her status in Ugarit. The earliest academic survey of the deities mentioned in the corpus recovered from this site was prepared by Gary Beckman and published in 2002. It did not include Anat at all, though in 1996 there was identified a possible reference to a toponym derived from her name. The proposal that a theophoric name invoking her, Anat-ummī, in present the text Emar 216:6 (and passim) is also accepted today. Mark Smith notes that the nature of the Emar corpus needs to be taken into account when evaluating the prominence of deities in the local system of beliefs, as relatively few genres of texts are represented among tablets from the site.

William W. Hallo and Hayim Tadmor identified a possible reference to Anat in theophoric names in a lawsuit from Tel Hazor with the element ḫa-nu-ta. The text has been dated to the period between the eighteenth and sixteenth centuries BCE. A single theophoric name, Anati, is also known from Byblos. Furthermore, a document from the reign of Ramesses II mentions a man from an unspecified location in modern Syria. He bore the name bn ‘nt, and served as a ship captain.

In April 2022, media reports referred to an uninscribed head of a statue discovered by a farmer in the Gaza Strip as a depiction of Anat. However, it has been noted in past scholarship that while she, Ashtart and Athirat are "often taken to be possible candidates when a new representation was found it should (...) be kept in mind that there were also other goddesses." The identification of individual deities of the region in art is considered difficult without accompanying inscriptions, in part due to lack of documents providing information about the composition of the local pantheon of a given location, even for well known sites like Megiddo. The only representation of Anat from the Levant directly identified as such by an accompanying inscription follows Egyptian artistic conventions and dates back to the twelfth century BCE.

=== The logogram ^{d}NIN.URTA as a representation of Anat ===
In 1990, Nadav Na'aman suggested that in the Amarna letters, the logogram ^{d}NIN.URTA, which appears in the entire corpus only four times and has been a subject of scholarly debate, designates Anat. He points out that despite her well attested role in religions of the second millennium BCE, no logographic writing of her name has been otherwise identified, with the exception of pseudo-logographic ^{d}IGI-at from Ugarit, even though logographic writing of other major deity names is well attested in other western text corpora from the late Bronze Age. He argues that the shared character of Anat and Ninurta as warlike deities would make such an association easy to accept in antiquity. This conclusion is also supported by Gebhard J. Selz. Na'aman assumes that the difference of gender might have not been obvious to the western theologians due to the presence of the sign NIN in many feminine theonyms of Sumerian origin. An earlier proposal was that ^{d}NIN.URTA refers to Hauron in this context, but according to Na'aman this is implausible, as this god was associated with incantations and exorcisms, rather than war. Hauron's position in known pantheons was typically low, and he is entirely absent from theophoric personal names from the discussed time period unlike ^{d}NIN.URTA. Based on Na'aman's theory, it has subsequently been proposed that the temple of ^{d}NIN.URTA, where Abdi-Ashirta mustered his troops according to the Amarna letter number 74, line 36, should be understood as belonging to Anat. Na'aman himself also proposed that a king of Siyannu attested in a single Ugaritic text, Abdi-^{d}NIN.URTA, was the same person as the better known Abdi-Anati, a contemporary of Niqmepa.

Peggy L. Day, also relying on Na'aman's proposal, argues that the deity designated as ^{d}NIN.URTA in texts from Emar might also be Anat. However, in a more recent summary of plausible proposals regarding the identity of this presently anonymous deity, Gary Beckman only lists Resheph, who he considers a likely (though nonetheless speculative) option himself due to his presence in many theophoric names and his warlike character. Joan Goodnick Westenholz proposed that a uniquely local deity, known as Il Imari (or Ḫamari), "the Emariote god," is the one indicated. Both DINGIR (to be read as Il) i-ma-ri and ^{d}Ḫa-ma-ri are attested in Emariote sources. Michael P. Streck does accept the view that Anat was regarded as analogous to Ninurta in Amurru and further south, in Canaan. He considers the identity of the Emariote ^{d}NIN.URTA uncertain, citing Westenholz's Il Imari proposal and the Mesopotamian Ninurta, but not Anat, as possibilities. Yoram Cohen considers Resheph, Il Imari and Attar, suggested by Daniel Arnaud, to be plausible identification proposals.

=== The Elkunirša myth ===
According to Daniel Schwemer, it is sometimes assumed that a goddess designated by the logogram ^{d}IŠTAR in the myth of Elkunirša (CTH 342) which is known from Hittite archives might be Anat (or perhaps Ashtart). This proposal is not universally accepted, and according to Steve A. Wiggins there is no indication that the characters present in it necessarily match these known from Ugaritic mythology. Mary R. Bachvarova recently pointed out that the goddess' name appears to actually be ^{d}IŠTAR-iš, which according to her would suggest that Hittite Anzili is meant. The origin of this text itself is also a matter of scholarly dispute. Daniel Schwemer considers it to be unknown. Bachvarova points out a reference to a person from the kingdom of Amurru, and presumes that the origin can be broadly attributed to a West Semitic literary milieu. Wiggins assumes that even if it originated in a Canaanite area, it likely went through a number of changes during its transmission. Itamar Singer argued that it was formed in a "cultural koinē consisting of an intricate fusion of Semitic and Hurrian elements." The role of ^{d}IŠTAR in the tale is to inform a weather god that the eponymous deity (whose name might be derived from an epithet of the Ugaritic god El) and his wife, Ašertu (Athirat), are plotting against him. Both Ugaritic Baal and Hittite Tarḫunna have been proposed as the identity of the weather god.

== First millennium BCE attestations ==
=== Mesopotamian sources ===
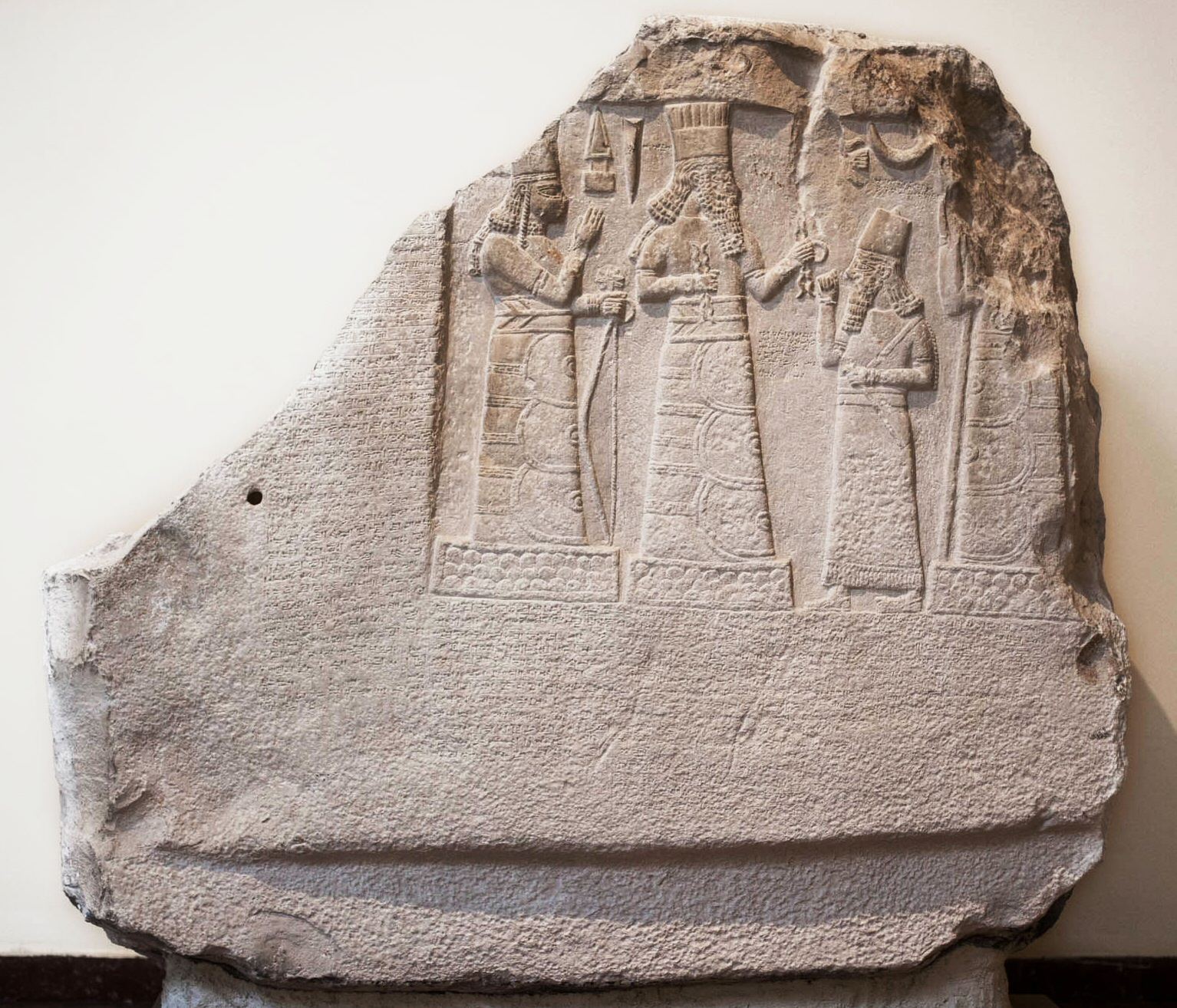
The stele of Šamaš-reš-uṣur, with Anat depicted on the far right.

The city of Anat is attested as the main cult center of Anat in Mesopotamia based on sources from the eighth century BCE. The E-šuzianna temple, according to later inscriptions already patronized by the Old Babylonian king Hammurabi, remained in use. While the surrounding area, still known as Suhum, came under the control of Assyria, local culture and religion in the first millennium BCE were instead influenced by Babylonia. Next to Anat, the main deity of her city was Adad, but it is not known how the relation between them was conceptualized. Daniel Schwemer points out that the role of Adad's wife was most likely played by the weather goddess Shala, rather than Anat. The relationship between Adad and Shala is attested elsewhere in Mesopotamia.

A stela found in Babylon inscribed with the name of Šamaš-reš-uṣur, who served as the governor of Suhu around 760 BCE, is presumed to depict Anat alongside other deities following a proposal of Antoine Cavigneaux and Bahija Khalil Ismail from 1990. The fragment of the inscription referring to her is damaged, and the image itself is also damaged. The other two deities are identified as Ishtar and Adad. All three of them are depicted in feathered crowns and robes decorated with rondels, following the Babylonian artistic convention of the period. It has been proposed that a fourth deity was originally depicted on a section which has since broken off, but this remains speculative. The deities are accompanied by a smaller depiction of Šamaš-reš-uṣur himself, who unlike them is instead dressed in typically Assyrian manner,. Also included are symbols of Marduk (spade), Nabu (stylus) and Sin (crescent). The similarity of the artwork on this stele to the kudurru (boundary stone) of Nabu-shuma-ishkun has been noted.

Ninurta-kudurri-usur, the son of Šamaš-reš-uṣur, at one point renovated the E-šuzianna temple. His inscription referring to this event describes Anat as "the perfect lady, most exalted of the goddesses, most powerful of the goddesses, greatest of the Igīgu gods, august lady whose godhead is splendid, splendid lady whose valour is not equalled by (that of any of) the (other) goddesses." He also asserts that at an unspecified point prior to his reign, the Assyrians desecrated a statue of Anat, took away its ornaments, and then hid it somewhere, where it remained until he recovered it. Like his other inscriptions, this text in written in the Babylonian dialect of Akkadian, though it shows Assyrian and Aramaic influence as well. The name of Anat is written as an-at. Among the other gods mentioned are Shamash, Marduk, Adad, Apladad and Misharu.

=== Phoenician sources ===
Anat's position in Phoenician religion is a topic of debate among researchers. Reconstruction of Phoenician religious beliefs is difficult due to the scarcity and the laconic nature of available sources. Cultural continuity with Ugaritic religion cannot be established. It has been argued that the small number of theophoric names invoking Anat and the lack of much other evidence pertaining to her cult might be an indication that Anat's worship in the west had declined compared to her status in the second millennium BCE. Izak Cornelius goes as far as arguing that she outright disappeared from many of the local pantheons, but Peggy L. Day argues against this conclusion.

Four inscribed votive objects dedicated to Anat have been discovered in Idalion on Cyprus. Since two of them are a horse binder (dated to the seventh century BCE) and a spearhead (dated to the fifth or early fourth century BCE), it is assumed that Anat had retained her warlike nature (which is known from Ugaritic sources) in Phoenician religion as well. A bilingual Phoenician-Greek inscription, the Anat-Athena bilingual has also been found in Larnakas tis Lapithou. The Greek version refers to "Athena Soteria Nike" instead of Anat, presumably due to the shared marital nature and, according to Peggy L. Day, the characterization of both as "non-sexually active, non-reproductive goddesses." Comparisons between Anat and Athena have also been made by modern researchers of Greek religion, such as Walter Burkert, who highlighted the similarities in iconography of martial deities excavated in Greece (especially statuettes referred to with the term Palladion) and Syria. The goddess referred to as Athena by Philo of Byblos has also been argued to be Anat. Philo states that Athena's sister was Persephone, who might be simply the Greek goddess in this case, as she was worshiped in Samaria; a connection with Ugaritic Arsay cannot be proven. However, as noted by Richard J. Clifford, from the 1980s onwards commenters on Philo's work point out that while at least some elements of his account are a reflection of authentic Phoenician beliefs, it should be understood primarily as Hellenizing and heavily influenced by Greek mythology, rather than Phoenician mythology, and therefore not entire reliable for the study of earlier periods.

The identification of the deity ^{d}A-na-ti ba-a-ti DINGIR.MEŠ, possibly to be read as Anat-Bayt’el, in the treaty between Esarhaddon and king Baal of Tyre with Anat is considered implausible. Day notes that while such proposals are present in scholarship, the name might also be an unrelated compound noun. While it is conventionally assumed that Anat-Bayt’el was one of the main deities of Tyre, Karel van der Toorn has called into question if the name has Phoenician origin at all due to the lack of other attestations from this city and nearby areas. He proposes that was derived from Aramaic instead.

The assertion that Tanit, worshiped in Carthage, was the same deity as Anat can be found in older literature, for example in the publications of William F. Albright. According to Steve A. Wiggins, such assertions should be treated cautiously. It cannot necessarily be assumed that Tanit corresponds to any major goddess from the second millennium.

=== Hebrew Bible ===
The only certain references to Anat in the Hebrew Bible are the theophoric name Shamgar ben Anat (Judges 3:31), and the place names Beth-Anath (Joshua 19:38 and Judges 1:33) Two further possible examples are the toponym Anathoth (Jeremiah 1:1) and the homophonous name Anathoth (Nehemiah 10:20). Steve A. Wiggins based on available evidence concludes that Anat was only "vestigially present" in the Kingdom of Israel. Karel van der Toorn reaches a similar conclusion.

Most researchers agree that the single verse which mentions Shamgar ben Anat and his victory over six hundred Philistines was a late addition to the Book of Judges, and that it most likely represents an entirely fictitious account, possibly inspired by better known feats attributed to Samson or soldiers of David. Nili Shupak suggests that "ben Anat" should be interpreted as a cognomen designating its bearer as a warrior from a troop dedicated to Anat due to her well-known character as a war deity. Shupak points out that multiple examples of similar theophoric names of soldiers are known. The analogous name bn ‘nt is known from an inscribed arrowhead dated to the eleventh century BCE and from a seal with a Hebrew inscription of unknown provenance dated to the eight or seventh century BCE. An alternate proposal, originally formulated by William F. Albright, is that ben Anat simply indicates that Shamgar was born in Beth Anat. This option is considered unlikely by Shupak.

The proposal that ‘annôt in the Masoretic Text of Exodus 32:18 should be reinterpreted as a reference to Anat is considered implausible. It relies on the incorrect assumption that Anat was a fertility goddess associated with human sexuality, and as such can be associated with the described licentious behaviour pertaining to the worship of the golden calf. Furthermore, the idol constructed by the Israelites is described as a young bull (‘gl), while a representation of a female deity would be more likely referred to as a heifer (‘glh) instead. The proposal that the Queen of Heaven from the Book of Jeremiah (7:18, 44:17) might be Anat, while reliant on well attested Ugaritic and Egyptian epithets, is also considered implausible.

=== Disputed proposals ===
Two possible theonyms with Anat as an element have been identified in Aramaic texts from the fifth century BCE Elephantine, ‘ntyhw and ‘ntbyt’l. However, in both cases the element ‘nt might instead be a common noun. It has been argued that they are genitival constructs, respectively "Anat of Yahu" and "Anat of Bethel," the latter possibly corresponding to the deity Anat-Bayt’el known from the treaty between Esarhaddon and king Baal of Tyre. Bayt’el or Bethel might have been the eponymous god of the settlement Bethel, tentatively identified with modern Bet Laha, located 30 km (19 mi) west of Aleppo. The element Yahu is presumed to correspond to Yahweh, the national god of the Israelites. It has been argued that both ‘ntyhw and ‘ntbyt’l should be understood as consorts of the male gods mentioned in their names. However, it was already questioned in the 1990s if the names should be translated as "Anat, consort of Yahu" and "Anat, consort of Bethel," and according to Susan Ackerman, the current majority view is that the name Anat-Yahu instead should be understood as a hypostasis of Yahu. The first element of the name is a common noun meaning "providence" or "sign."

An Aramaic inscription from Egypt mentioning a priest of Anat is known, but its authenticity has been called into question by Ackerman. It is a part of the Michaelides collection, multiple objects from which are known for repeated documentational irregularities. The irregularities suggest that they might be inauthentic.

It is sometimes argued that the goddess Atargatis, worshiped in modern Syria in the Hellenistic and Roman periods, represented a fusion of Anat and Ashtart. This proposal is based on William F. Albright's assertion that Atta might be an Aramaic form of Anat's name, and that therefore the name of Atargatis can be plausibly explained as a combination of Anat's and Ashtart's. This view has been criticized by Peggy L. Day, who, following an earlier study by Jo Ann Hackett, points out that the popularity of such theories in past scholarship is tied to the notion that goddesses were interchangeable and had no discernible individual traits. She suggests that the proposal requires "critical reassessment."

=== Comparative scholarship ===
In the 1960s it has been argued that the Hindu goddess Kālī, who is first attested in the 7th century CE, shares some characteristics with some ancient Near Eastern goddesses, such wearing a necklace of heads and a belt of severed hands like Anat, and drinking blood like the Egyptian goddess Sekhmet and that therefore that her character might have been influenced by them. A myth describes how Kali became ecstatic with the joy of battle and slaughter while killing demons, and refused to stop until she was pacified by her consort, Shiva, who threw himself under her feet. Marvin H. Pope in 1977 wrote that this myth exhibits parallels to the Ugaritic myth in which Anat started attacking warriors, which describes the goddess as gloating and her heart filling with joy and her liver with laughter while attaching the heads of warriors to her back and girding hands to her waist until she is pacified by a message of peace sent by Baal.

=== Use of the name in present-day Israel ===
"Anat" (ענת) is commonly used as a female first name in present-day Israel (see list of people so named in Anat (disambiguation). This is one of the Biblical names introduced by the Zionist Movement and not attested among earlier Jewish communities.
