= Kinnaru =

Ugaritic god representing a deified instrument

- Deified string instrument
- Major cult center: Ugarit

Kinnaru (Ugaritic: 𐎋𐎐𐎗, knr) was an Ugaritic god who functioned as the deification of a string instrument, most likely the lyre. He is sparsely attested in the Ugaritic texts, appearing only in a handful of god lists and offering lists. He is entirely absent from known myths. It is sometimes assumed that a mythical king of Cyprus mentioned in the Iliad, Cinyras, was derived from him.

== Name and character ==
The Ugaritic word knr, as of 1999 attested six times in known Ugaritic texts, functioned both as an ordinary noun referring to a string instrument and as the name of the god Kinnaru, its deification. It is likely that the sound of the instrument was imagined to be the voice of the corresponding god. It is sometimes considered uncertain if kinnaru was a harp or a lyre, but Dennis Pardee considers the latter option to be correct, as does Gabriele Theuer. Cognates of its name are also attested in other Semitic languages, for example in Eblaite (kinnārum) and Hebrew (kinnor).

In a single case, the name of Kinnaru is rendered in standard syllabic cuneiform as ^{d.giš}ki-na-rum. The first of the two determinatives, dingir, indicates it was the name of a deity, while the second, giš, designated wooden objects, among them string instruments. It is possible that rendering the name phonetically, rather than using the Sumerian term balaĝ attested as the equivalent of the word kinnaru elsewhere, was meant to highlight the god's strictly local character. No instruments other than the kinnaru were deified in Ugaritic religion. However, multiple deities representing various musical instruments are known from elsewhere in the Ancient Near East, one well attested example being the Mesopotamian goddess Ninigizibara.

The proposal that the toponym Kinneret might be an indication that a female deification of the kinnar was worshiped outside Ugarit is not considered plausible due to lack of evidence in textual sources.

== In the Ugaritic texts ==
In one of the lists of deities, Kinnaru appears near the end, after Yam (the god of the sea) and Uṯḫatu (the deification of a ritual censer). He also appears alongside the latter in another list, written in the syllabic cuneiform script. Another text attests that he received a ram as offering after Uṯḫatu. Their juxtaposition might reflect the fact that both of them were divine representations of tools frequently employed during religious ceremonies.

Kinnaru is absent from known Ugaritic myths, though the ordinary noun knr does occur in them. John Franklin additionally argues that it is not impossible a nameless god who in the Baal Cycle signs the praise for Baal might be Kinnaru, arguing that no other members of the Ugaritic pantheon appear to be associated with music. However, said deity plays the cymbals, not a string instrument.

== Kinnaru and Kothar ==
Kinnaru and Kothar-wa-Khasis were seen as two distinct gods at Ugarit, but some of their functions overlapped. Yet outside of Ugarit, they could have been seen as the same god, by analogy with Philo’s Phoenician god Khousor. This is argued by Franklin, who sees Kinnaru as "a musical brother" of Kothar. Franklin also points out that, at Ugarit, "the Rāp’iu text suggests a ‘familiar’ relationship between Kothar and kinnāru/Kinnaru, the former apparently enjoying the more prominent position."

== Kinnaru and Cinyras ==
A connection between the Ugaritic Kinnaru and the mythical king of Cyprus, Cinyras (Kinyras), has been postulated as far back as James Frazer in 1914, and by others before him. Although J. P. Brown in 1965 cast some doubt in this area, the subsequent discoveries in Ugarit made the connection even more probable.

Cinyras is mentioned in the Iliad, which gives him a Bronze Age pedigree. Although the most detailed known account of this figure was only compiled by Eustathius of Thessalonica in the twelfth century CE, a lot more is known about him now from various Semitic sources. While only a small number of the older sources link Cinyras with music, classicist John Franklin's extensive study has filled in some of the missing links in this area.

Proponents of the view that he is related to the Ugaritic Kinnaru point at the political relations between Ugarit and Alashiya (Cyprus) in the Bronze Age, which might have made the transfer of Kinnaru possible. As an extension of this theory, it has been argued that the juxtaposition of Kinnaru and Uṯḫatu (the Divine Censer) in Ugaritic documents might be reflected in Kinyras' association with Myrrha.

== In the Bible ==
According to Nicolas Wyatt, it is possible that a handful of verses in the Hebrew Bible, specifically in Psalm 49 and Psalm 57, preserve a distant reflection of the worship of a deified lyre analogous to Ugaritic Kinnaru, though neither composition directly refers to such a figure.
