= Yam (god) =

Ugaritic sea god

- God of the sea
- Ugaritic: 𐎊𐎎
- Major cult center: Ugarit

Equivalents
- Hurrian: Kiaše, Ḫedammu
- Greek: Pontos

Yam (sometimes Yamm; Ugaritic: 𐎊𐎎, romanized: Yammu; 'sea') was a god representing the sea and other sources of water worshiped in various locations on the eastern Mediterranean coast, as well as further inland in modern Syria. He is best known from the Ugaritic texts. While he was a minor deity in Ugaritic religion, he is nonetheless attested as a recipient of offerings, and a number of theophoric names invoking him have been identified. He also played a role in Ugaritic mythology. In the Baal Cycle he is portrayed as an enemy of the weather god, Baal. Their struggle revolves around attaining the rank of the king of the gods. The narrative portrays Yam as the candidate favored by the senior god El, though ultimately it is Baal who emerges victorious. Yam nonetheless continues to be referenced through the story after his defeat. In texts from other archaeological sites in Syria, attestations of Yam are largely limited to theophoric names. In Emar he was among the many deities venerated during a local festival, zukru, which took place once every seven years.

Yam was also known in Ancient Egypt, though there is no evidence that he was actively worshiped in ancient Egyptian religion. He plays a role in a myth preserved in the so-called Astarte Papyrus, which is presumed to be an adaptation of western motifs, though not necessarily of the Baal Cycle. Yam is portrayed as an enemy of the Ennead who demands a tribute from the other gods, while the eponymous goddess is tasked with bringing it to him. Set, who serves as a stand-in for Baal, is responsible for defeating him, though the outcome of their battle is only known from references in incantations, as the ending of the Astarte Papyrus is not preserved. Yam is also present in the Tale of Two Brothers.

In the Hebrew Bible, Yam appears as an enemy of Yahweh. It is presumed that his presence reflects a reference of a shared West Semitic tradition on early Israelite literature. A further possible reference to Yam has been identified in the Phoenician History of Philo of Byblos, a Hellenistic euhemeristic work combining Phoenician and Greco-Roman elements. One of the figures mentioned in this work, Pontos, is presumed to constitute a translation of Yam.

In comparative scholarship, Yam's role in the Baal Cycle is often analyzed alongside other myths from the region focused on battles between figures representing the weather and the sea. Historically the conflict with Tiamat in Enūma Eliš was seen as a close parallel, though in more recent scholarship differences between these two narratives and the respective roles of these figures have also been pointed out. Comparisons have also been made between Yam and Kiaše and Ḫedammu from Hurrian mythology.

== Name and character ==
The theonym written as ym (𐎊𐎎) in the Ugaritic alphabetic script is vocalized in modern literature as Yam, Yamm or Yammu. It is identical with the ordinary Ugaritic noun meaning 'sea'. Its use as a theonym in Ugaritic religion reflects the deification of the corresponding geographical feature. Yam accordingly functioned as the deification of the sea. He was also associated with other bodies of water. It has been argued that in Ugaritic myths he is fully anthropomorphic. However, no known sources describe his iconography. Yam's secondary name was Nahar, "River". His most common epithet, and the third most common epithet in the Ugaritic text corpus overall, is ṯpṭ nhr, "judge River" or "ruler River", ṯpṭ being a cognate of Hebrew shophet. It has been suggested that Nahar might have originally been a separate deity who eventually came to be conflated with Yam. Aicha Rahmouni argues that the full epithet should be understood as a reference to river ordeal, in which she assumes he played a role comparable to the Mesopotamian god Idlurugu. However, Herbert Niehr concludes that this title only reflected Yam's mastery over freshwater, as river ordeal is not attested in sources from Ugarit. Yam was also addressed as a "prince" (zbl), though in ten out of eleven cases this title occurs only in parallel with ṯpṭ nhr.

A cognate of Yam's Ugaritic name has been identified in the Akkadian dialect used in Emar. It was written in cuneiform as ^{d}Ya-a-mi. Cognate words referring to the sea occur in Phoenician, Aramaic, Hebrew and Arabic. Furthermore, the early form wa-mu or wa-mu-um (/wammu(m)/) has also been identified in Eblaite. It preserves an "archaic *w-prototype of this lexeme" predating the shift from w to y attested in Northwest Semitic languages. As a loanword, the word yammu is also attested in Egyptian under a variety of spellings, typically as a designation for the Mediterranean Sea, though it could function as a theonym too.

In texts from Ugarit written in syllabic cuneiform, the sign sequence A.AB.BA, elsewhere read as the Akkadian word tâmtu, could be employed to write the ordinary word yammu as well as Yam's name, as attested in a lexical text mentioning ^{d}A.AB.BA and by the logographic writing of the theophoric name 'bdym, ÌR.A.AB.BA. However, ^{d}A.AB.BA does not appear as an entry in any Mesopotamian god lists. A figure whose name is written this way appears in the Myth of the Plough, a text only known from a single late copy from either the Neo-Babylonian or Achaemenid period, but she is female and has been characterized as dissimilar to Yam by Aaron Tugendhaft.

In addition to functioning as a distinct theonym, the Ugaritic word ym is also attested as a part of one of the epithets of Athirat, rbt 'aṯrt ym, "Lady Athirat of the Sea". However, it is agreed that in this case the ordinary word is meant, rather than an allusion to an unknown myth involving Yam and this goddess. Athirat's association with the sea understood as a body of water rather than a deity is well attested, but its nature is poorly understood. However, Steve A. Wiggins suggests that due to Yam's primary role as a sea god, "his domain is probably not encroached upon by that of Athirat". Two literary passages which might refer to deities as bn ym, "son of the sea", are also assumed to refer to the body of water rather than Yam.

== Ugaritic texts ==
Yam is best known from the Ugaritic texts, though he was a low ranking deity in the Ugaritic pantheon. In the standard list of deities, he occupies the thirtieth position, after the assembly of the gods treated collectively (Puḫru 'Ilīma) and before 'Uṯḫatu, the deified censer. In the corresponding list of offerings, he is the recipient of a ram, similarly as most of the other deities. He receives the same animal in a text labeled as the "Sacrificial liturgy for the Gods-of-the-Land". Another offering of a ram is mentioned in the text RS 1.009, which states that it took place on the third day of an unidentified month. RS 1.001, the first text discovered during the excavations at Ras Shamra, a description of a ritual taking place over the course of a single day and night, mentions the sacrifice of a cow to Yam at night, after a similar offering to Išḫara and before these aimed at Baal and Yarikh. In a similar list, RS 24.246, Yam and Baal occupy the same line together as the third entry, after Išḫara and before Yarikh. This placement might reflect their interactions in the Baal Cycle.

Thirteen individuals bearing theophoric names invoking Yam have been identified in the Ugaritic texts. Examples include Yammu'ilu ("Yam is god"), 'Iluyammu ("a god is Yam"), Milkuyammu ("a king is Yam") and 'Abduyammi ("servant of Yam").

=== Baal Cycle ===
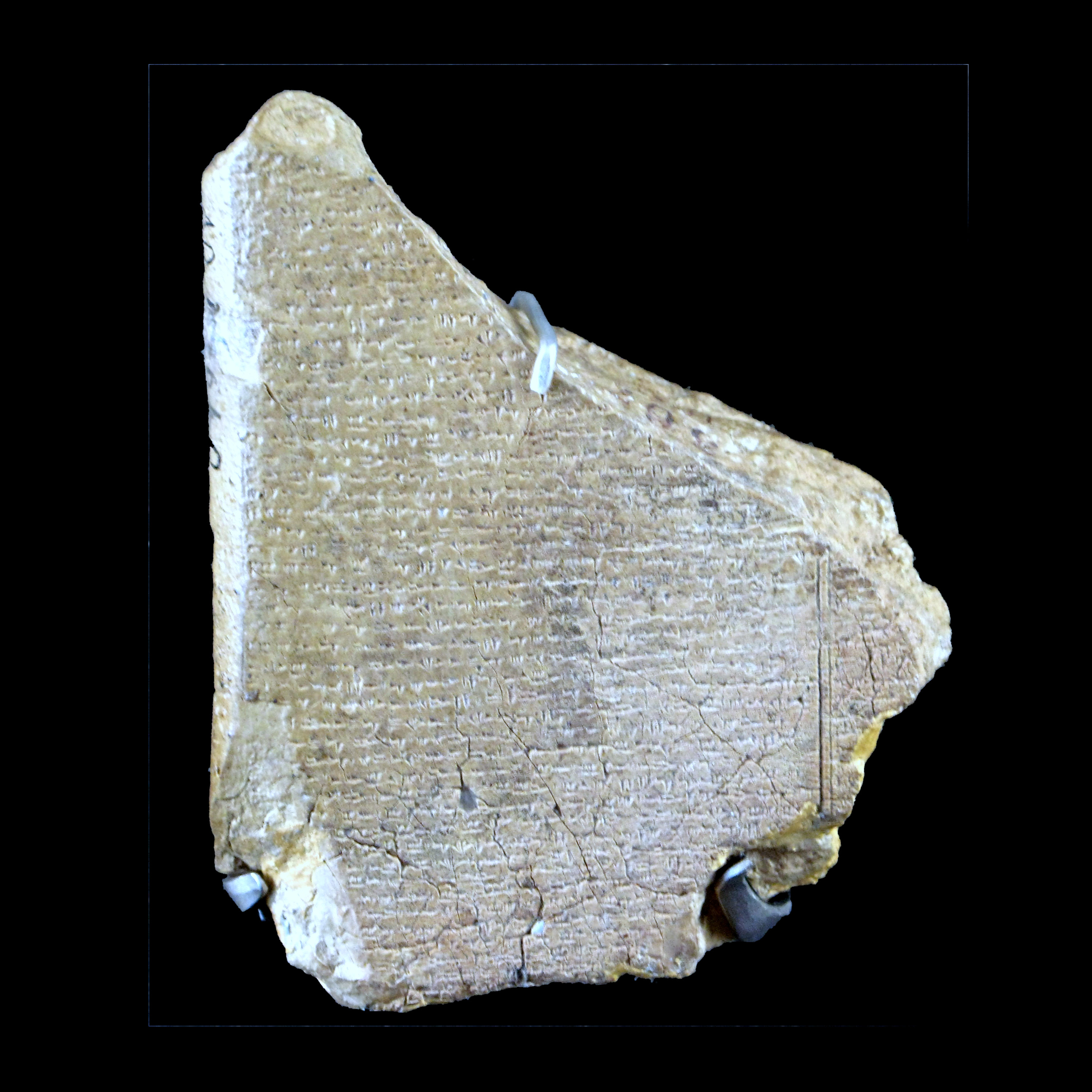
One of the tablets of the Baal Cycle. Louvre.

In the Baal Cycle (KTU 1.1-1.6) Yam is portrayed as one of the enemies of the eponymous god, Baal. He is his main rival in the struggle for the status of king of the gods. The conflict between Yam and Baal is considered one of the three major episodes of the Baal Cycle, with the other two being the construction of Baal's palace and his conflict with Mot. It forms approximately one third of the full composition. Theodore J. Lewis has summarized the confrontation between them as "the second most riveting scene in the Baʿlu Cycle (bettered only by Baʿlu's battle with Motu)".

The motif of the combat between the weather god and the sea first occurs in a letter sent by a certain Nūr-Sîn, a representative of Mari in Aleppo, to king Zimri-Lim. A passage in it has the form of a message from Adad:

I gave the entire of this land to Yahdun-Lim! Furthermore, because of my weaponry, he had no rival. He forsook me, so the land that I had given to him I gave to Shamshi-Adad. [...] that I could restore you to the throne of your father's house. I did restore you! I gave you the weaponry with which I did battle with the Sea. I anointed you with the oil of my triumph, so no one stood against you.

It has been argued that an incantation from Ebla in which the weather god, Hadda, vanquishes snakes with the help of Ammarik, might be an even earlier example, but according to Daniel Schwemer no conclusive evidence in favor of this interpretation is available. In the early tradition the enemy of the weather god was known as Têmtum, a "sea numen" (Meernumen). The name of this figure was written without the so-called divine determinative (dingir) in cuneiform. Seals showing a weather god striking a serpent have been tentatively identified as a representation of the battle between Adad and Têmtum. Maciej Popko has proposed that the motif of battle against the sea reached inland Syria from Ugarit, but this interpretation is regarded as unlikely. Most likely a variant of the account known from the Mari was integrated into Ugaritic tradition, and as a result eventually into the Baal Cycle.

In the beginning of the Ugaritic narrative, Yam is presented as El's favored candidate for the position of the king of the gods, and he seemingly enjoys the support of much of the divine council. He is described as "the beloved of El" (mdd 'il), which reflects the special status assigned to him by the head of the pantheon. He also receives the name Yam from him in place of his original name yw (𐎊𐎆). The interpretation of the latter remains a matter of scholarly dispute, though it has been tentatively related to Ieuo known from Philo of Byblos' Phoenician History, a deity apparently worshiped in Beirut in antiquity. Smith argues that "Ieuo is more likely to be a deity indigenous to Phoenicia than to Israel, and the identification to Ieuo with Yamm/yw, though by no means assured, is preferable to an equation with Yahweh" It is possible that Athirat is responsible for proclaiming the bestowal of the additional name upon Yam. El also addresses Yam as his son, which might reflect either actual parentage or adoption related to his royal status. Furthermore, he orders Kothar-wa-Khasis to build a palace for the sea god. Its construction is meant to signify his legitimacy. Baal's position in the narrative is comparatively weaker, but he is presented as the better candidate for the position of the king of the gods by the narrator.

Yam is also mentioned in the passage which follows the description of El enlisting Kothar-wa-Khasis' help, which focuses on Shapash, but due to the state of preservation of the tablet the full context remains uncertain. The sun goddess, apparently acting as a messenger, is talking with Athtar, who has just learned about Yam's new position and shows displeasure with not being selected himself. However, she points out to him that if El wants to make Yam the king, he will not hearken to Athtar's opinion. She also warns him that if he questions the new status quo, El might in turn question his authority. Athtar as a result does not interfere with Yam's activities. Yam subsequently meets with his own messengers. These two minor deities, addressed as "the embassy of judge Nahar" (t'dt ṯpṭ nhr), are left unnamed. They are described as fiery. This lead researchers to compare them with other messengers known from Ancient Near Eastern religious literature said to possess similar qualities, such as the Mesopotamian god Ishum ("fire"), an attendant of Erra, as well as the angel from Exodus 3:2 described as a "fiery flame" or the seraphim, whose name is derived from the root *śrp, "to burn". While a "servant of Yam" or "youth of Yam" (gml ym) is also mentioned in the Epic of Kirta, according to Manfred Krebernik this phrase might only be a poetic way to refer to a wave or sea creature in this context. Yam tells the messengers to visit the divine assembly, instructing them in advance to not bow down to El. This represents a breach of social norms, as in theory as deities of lesser rank they are not permitted to show defiance. They are also told to repeat Yam's announcement to the other gods:

Decree of Yamm, your Master,
Your Lord, Judge River:
"Give up, o Gods, the one you obey,
The one you obey, o Multitude;
Give up Baal that I may humble him,
The Son of Dagan (Note: The use of the epithet connecting Baal to Dagan is meant to highlight his status as a deity from outside El's family.) that I may seize his gold."

As soon as the gathered gods notice them approaching, they bow their heads, but Baal rebukes them for it. The reaction of the assembly presumably reflects submission to Yam's rule. The messengers eventually arrive, and following Yam's instructions do not bow to anyone while presenting the message. El responds by declaring Baal is now to be considered Yam's captive, and obliges him to provide the sea god with tribute. Baal wants to attack the messengers, though he is stopped by Ashtart and Anat. It has been argued that this point of the narrative represents the peak of Yam's power over the pantheon, with only Baal being willing to oppose him. The next passage is poorly preserved, but it has been proposed that either Baal or Yam issues a declaration of battle to the other through messengers.

The beginning of the section describing the confrontation between the two rivals is difficult to interpret, but it is presumed Baal falls under the power of Yam, apparently described as "the sieve of destruction". Mark S. Smith argues that since Yam is still at "the apogee of his power", Baal apparently curses against him. It has been proposed that he subsequently sinks underneath Yam's throne and a third party, possibly Ashtart, affirms that he is losing, though the interpretation of this fragment is disputed. However, Kothar-wa-Khasis reassures Baal and crafts two weapons for him, declaring that he will be able to defeat Yam. They are presumed to be either maces or fictional lightning-like weapons, known from depictions of weather gods. They both receive names, meant to designate them as capable of "expelling" and "driving away" Yam from his throne. Baal first strikes him with Yagarrish ("may-it-drive-out"), but is unsuccessful, and only with the second strike, using Ayyamarri ("anyone-it-may-expel"), does he actually defeat him. Yam collapses on the ground, though the fight continues. Baal might be "ensnaring" him. A possible reference to "drying up" has also been identified. In the following passage Ashtart according to most interpreters rebukes Baal, possibly because he did not act quickly or wisely enough in battle. Alternate proposals include understanding her words as a warning not to further harm already defeated Yam, or a curse directed at the sea god. The meaning of the term describing Baal's actions in Ashtart's speech, bṯ, is uncertain, though "scatter" has been proposed based on a possible Arabic cognate, baṯṯa, and on similar phrasing of the later section of the text dealing with Anat's victory over Mot. Ashtart subsequently proclaims Yam is now their captive. This declaration constitutes a reversal of El ordering Baal to become Yam's captive in an earlier section of the story. In the next passage uncertain speakers, possibly Ashtart and Kothar-wa-Khasis, proclaim Baal's kingship and state that Yam is dead. However, it is a matter of debate if he is actually destroyed or killed as a result of his battle with Baal. Meindert Dijkstra assumes that he was not, and Baal's victory only curtailed his power. Mark S. Smith notes that while the verb used to describe the conclusion of the fight, tkly, does have the base meaning of "destroy", in the light of further references to Yam in the story it is possible that either its verbal mood is meant to indicate that Baal only "would destroy" him if given the chance, or that it constitutes a relic of an earlier version of the story. He proposes that incorporation of the conflict between Baal and Yam into a longer narrative necessitated his reappearance despite a possible earlier version simply concluding with his death. It is also possible that Yam's continuous presence is meant to highlight that he represents a lasting threat, and perhaps hint at the battles against him repeating eternally.

Yam continues to play a role in the story of the Baal Cycle after his defeat. The section which immediately follows describes Baal hosting a banquet on Mount Saphon, possibly in order to celebrate Yam's defeat, but neither the attendees nor its purpose are known due to a lacuna. In another passage, Anat mentions Yam while enumerating enemies she defeated after being approached by Gupan and Ugar:

Surely I struck down Yamm, the Beloved of El,
Surely I finished off River, the Great God,
Surely I bound Tunnanu and destroyed him.
I struck down the Twisty Serpent,
The Powerful One with Seven Heads.
I struck down Desire, Beloved of El,
I destroyed Rebel, Calf of El.
I struck down Fire, Dog of El,
I annihilated Flame, Daughter of El,
That I might fight for silver, inherit gold.

Anat's intent seems to be to emphasize the connection between all of the listed enemies, including Yam, and El. Her speech might reference a different conflict related to Baal's struggle for kingship, though it has also been interpreted as a relic of an originally separate tradition in which Yam's defeat was attributed to her rather than the weather god, which was otherwise not incorporated into the Baal Cycle. If the former interpretation is accepted, it is possible that the battles were originally a part of the Baal Cycle, and their description occupied one of the lacunas on the earlier tablets. If the latter proposal is correct instead, the intent of the compilers might have been to harmonize originally separate accounts. A reference to Anat's battle with Yam or to a further tradition where she and Baal fought him together might be present in the text KTU 1.83. Aicha Rahmouni notes it is sometimes argued that the other monsters defeated by Anat were identified with Yam. Mark S. Smith and Wayne T. Pitard single out the dragon-like Tunnanu as a possible non-anthropomorphic form of the sea god. This conclusion has been criticized by Brendon C. Benz, who argues Yam and Tunnanu are presented as separate beings. He points out that he is never identified with either this being or other sea monsters, such as Lītān, in any other Ugaritic texts. Pitard has suggested that Yam might be identified with Tunnanu in KTU 1.83, though Benz instead argues text itself similarly does not necessarily indicate that they were identical.

It is possible that Yam is mentioned again when Athirat spots Baal and Anat approaching her. According to Steve A. Wiggins' interpretation, she orders her fisherman (Note: A title of Qudšu-wa-Amrur.) to restrain Yam with a net. Wiggins argues that once she realized Baal's intent is peaceful, she takes precautions to make sure his rival is kept at bay during their meeting. In the same section of the story, Baal complains about an affront he has recently faced. It is presumed that the enemy he mentions, who apparently insulted him in front of the divine assembly, was Yam.

Yam is mentioned again when Baal explains to Kothar-wa-Khasis why he does not want a window to be installed in his palace. He might be concerned that it would let Yam attack or kidnap his daughters, Pidray and Tallay. (Note: The third daughter, Arsay, is absent from this passage.) Baal's fears are seemingly unfounded, and both goddesses he is concerned about continue to appear in association with him in later sections of the text after the installation of the window. It is presumed that the section of the plot involving Yam is fully resolved shortly after this scene, when Baal invites all the other gods to his palace, but due to the state of preservation of the tablet the exact circumstances are uncertain. Yam's name appears in a poorly preserved passage which is agreed to be too short to contain a description of a battle. One possible interpretation is that the assembled deities guarantee their loyalty to Baal and reject allegiance to Yam.

According to Steve A. Wiggins, Yam is referenced once more in the hymn closing the Baal Cycle, which is dedicated to Shapash. However, an ordinary noun, either "sea" or "day", (Note: The Ugaritic word for day, yômu, was also written with the signs ym. Its cognates include Akkadian ūmu, Old Aramaic ywm and Arabic yawm.) might also be meant. Wiggins proposes that this passage might be a rubric alluding to the situation before Baal's victory over Yam, though also speculates whether it might be another indication that he is to be understood as a continuous threat in the narrative.

== Other Syrian sources ==
Yam was worshiped by Amorites, though the occurrences of this theonym are in this case almost entirely limited to theophoric names. Five of them have been identified among the 605 known from texts from western locations, such as the kingdoms of Qatna and Yamhad. Examples include 'Abdu-Yammim ("servant of Yam") from Tuttul, 'Adnī-Yammu ("Yam is my bliss") from Qatna, and Yammu-qadum ("Yam is ancient") from Yamhad. A reference to a Sutean named Yammi-'ila ("Yam is god") is also known.

A foundation inscription of Mariote king Yahdun-Lim mentions that upon reaching the Mediterranean coast (kišād ti'amtim), he made an offering to the sea (a-a-ab-ba), and his troops bathed in its waters. While the word is not written with the so-called divine determinative, it is presumed that a deity, specifically Yam, is nonetheless meant. The same king also gave Sumu-Yamam, possibly his son, and Ia-ma-ma, who might be his daughter, theophoric names invoking Yam. Individuals bearing names such as Abdiyamm ("servant of Yam") and Ilym ("Yam is god") are also mentioned in texts from Mari. According to Ryan D. Winters the god Emu (^{d}e-mu), who is described as "Nergal of Sūḫi" in the Mesopotamian god list Anšar = Anum, might also be identical with Yam; his association with Nergal would presumably reflect the latter's title lugala'abba, "king of the sea". However, it is also possible that Emu is instead related to another Mariote deity, the sparsely attested underworld god Âmûm (a-mu, a-mu-um or a-mi-im), whose name is not etymologically related to Yam's.

Yam is also attested in sources from Emar. An offering made jointly to him and a hypostasis of Ashtart (ša abi) is mentioned in the text of the zukru festival (tablet Emar 373+) in a section dealing with the distribution of lambs, wine and various types of bread to deities. The zukru took place once every seven years. It has a bigger scope than other attested celebrations known from Emar, and seemingly involved the entire pantheon of the city.

While later Aramean and Luwian artifacts from the same region, for example a stele from Tell Ashara (Terqa) and reliefs from Malatya in modern Turkey, have been interpreted as evidence for familiarity with the motif of a battle between the sea and a weather god, related textual sources do not mention Yam.

== Egyptian reception ==
Yam was also known in ancient Egypt. In the execration texts, dated to the reign of the Twelfth Dynasty, theophoric names of foreigners such as 'Abi-Yammu ("Yam is my father") and Yammu-na'umu ("Yam is pleasant") have been identified. However, his importance in ancient Egyptian religion was minor, and no active cult dedicated to him is attested in any Egyptian sources, though Richard H. Wilkinson proposed that he might have been a god "known and feared by Egyptian seafarers."

=== Astarte Papyrus and related sources ===
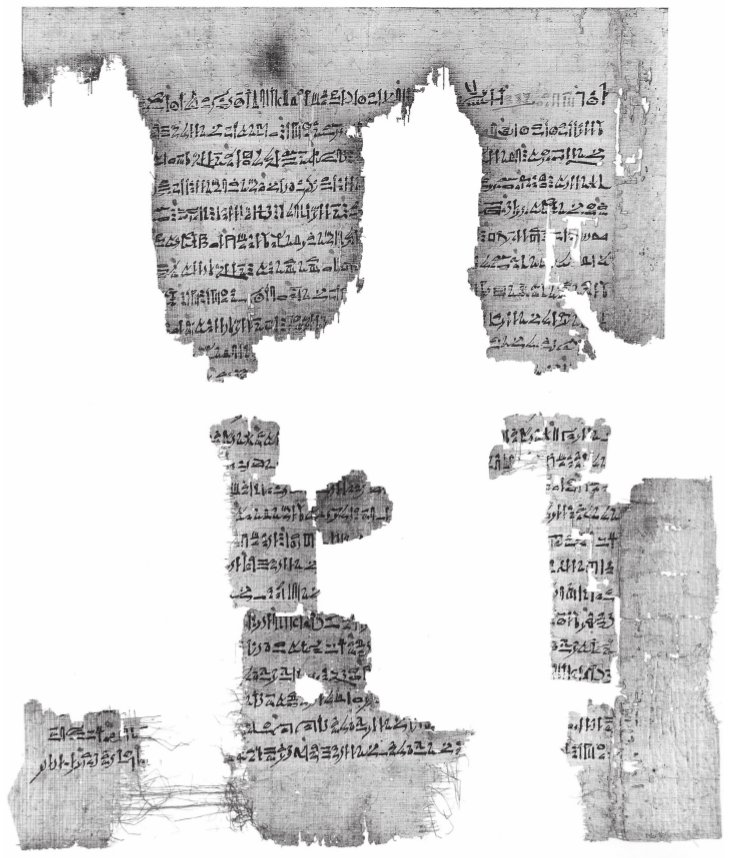
Surviving fragments of the myth Astarte and the Sea

Yam is also attested in the so-called Astarte Papyrus, which preserves a myth focused on him, Astarte and the Sea. There are multiple lacunas in the text, making it difficult to fully reconstruct and interpret the plot. In the beginning, Yam covers the earth with his waters, and demands to be made the head of the pantheon. The harvest goddess Renenutet is instructed to prepare a tribute of silver, gold and lapis lazuli for him. Her role in this composition is regarded as unusual, as she was a minor deity, and her activity seems unrelated to her usual character. After a lacuna a bird is sent by someone, possibly the same goddess, to fly to the house of Astarte and wake her up so that she can bring the gifts to the sea. She reacts to the request by weeping, but eventually reluctantly agrees, and in a poorly preserved passage she laughs and sings before Yam, who questions her arrival:

(...)Where have you come from, o daughter of Ptah, o furious and tempestuous goddess? Have you worn out the sandals that are on your feet? Have the clothes that are on you been torn by your going and coming through the sky and earth?

According to Mark S. Smith, Yam's recognition of Astarte's anger should be interpreted as an indication that her mission failed. She reports the outcome to the Ennead, and after a lacuna another tribute is offered to the sea, this time by Ptah, Geb and Nut. They apparently provide him with their jewelry as tribute due to his growing greed. A lacuna of over 100 lines follows; when the story resumes, the sea once again covers the earth, and in fragmentary context Set is mentioned. A description of the battle is not preserved, though it is known that it occurred in the lost sections due to a line explaining that the text describes deeds performed "in order to fight the Sea". Set presumably emerges victorious in the end. Allusions to combat between Yam and Set or Baal have also been identified in the Hearst Medical Papyrus, Greater Berlin Papyrus and Leiden Magical Papyrus. The second of these texts affirms that the sea god eventually yielded to his opponent according to Egyptian tradition. An ostracon from Deir el-Medina inscribed with a hymn dedicated to Ramesses III (oDeM 1222), which favorably compares the pharaoh to Set and highlights his mastery over the waves of the sea, might also constitute a reference to this tradition.

The Astarte Papyrus has been prepared to honor the pharaoh Amenhotep II, and due to the presence of Ptah it might have been composed in Memphis. However, the plot shows the influence of a West Semitic milieu, though with Set taking the role elsewhere assigned to Baal. It might have been derived directly from the Ugaritic Baal Cycle, though this proposal is not universally accepted, as a number of plot points find no parallel in the Baal Cycle. The motif of the sea deity demanding tribute has been compared to the Hurrian Song of the Sea, where the deity who suggests this solution is Kumarbi, and Šauška is tasked with bringing it; these two figures are, respectively, a deity associated with grain and a goddess associated with a weather god, similarly as Renenunet and Astarte. The Egyptian and Hurrian myths might have been adopted from the same source, distinct from the Ugaritic myth.

Relaying partially on the Astarte Papyrus, which according to her might contain a reference to marriage between Yam and Astarte, Noga Ayali-Darshan has suggested that originally they were viewed as spouses in the Levant. This proposal has been evaluated critically by Mark S. Smith, who points out the text indicates Astarte reacted with sadness to the Ennead's instruction, that the preserved details of the ending do not indicate a spousal relation between her and Yam, and the lack of parallels in Ugaritic material. He also notes that the supplementary evidence she provides, a possible connection between Emariote Ashtart ša abi and Yam, is not conclusive, as while they receive offerings together in a single case, the epithet of the former deity might instead refer to a type of shrine (abû), to a month in the local calendar (Abî), or to the plural of the word "father". The interpretation of the epithet ša abi as related to the word a-ab-ba ("sea") has already been already rejected by Daniel E. Fleming in an earlier study of Emariote texts. Smith accepts the possibility of a connection between the two deities, though he notes it might have been antagonistic, or that a tradition in which multiple gods competed for Ashtart might have existed.

=== Tale of Two Brothers ===
According to Noga Ayali-Darshan, Yam is also attested as a malevolent anthropomorphic figure in the Tale of Two Brothers. The interpretation of the sea as Yam in this text is also accepted by Herbert Niehr. One of the eponymous brothers, Bata, at one point warns his wife, a woman fashioned by the gods, to not go outside because the sea, or, as suggested by Ayali-Darshan, Yam, might take her away. When she leaves for a hunt, she nonetheless goes outside, where Yam notices her, and with the help of a tree manages to steal a lock of her hair. He subsequently takes it to Egypt and presents it to the pharaoh. Eventually the woman is taken to Egypt too and marries the pharaoh, which leads to Bata's death.

== Hebrew Bible ==
A number of references to Yam have been identified in the Hebrew Bible. It is presumed that they reflect the influence of a shared West Semitic tradition on early Israelite literature. In this context, he is presented as an enemy of Yahweh. Detailed descriptions of the subjugation of the sea can be found in Psalm 18:16, Psalm 74:13-14, Psalm 89:10 and Nahum 1:4. Psalm 74:13 specifically praises Yahweh with the words "It was you who destroyed Yamm with your might." Allusions to this motif are also present in other books, for example in Habakkuk 3:8, Psalm 46:3-4, Isaiah 51:15, Jeremiah 5:22 and 31:35. A number of references to Yam are also present in the Book of Job, for example in Job 7:12, Job asks "Am I Yamm or Tannin that you set a guard over me?" However, according to Fritz Stolz this text reflects the period in which the tradition of Yahweh's combat against the sea was vanishing. Mark S. Smith and Wayne T. Pitard additionally interpret tĕhôm rabbâ, "the Great Deep" mentioned in Isaiah 51:10, as a reference to Yam. A more speculative proposal is that since in Psalm 68:22, in the Masoretic Text the word "sea" (yām) is not provided with a definite article, it is used as a proper name and constitutes a reference to Yam, while the toponym Bashan present in the same line refers to a monster whose name would be cognate with Akkadian bashmu, with the passage originally referring to the "muzzling" (ešbōm) a personified body of water and a serpentine monster rather than "returning" (āšîb) from similarly named places. It has also been suggested that the description of the interior of the Temple in Jerusalem in 1 Kings 5–8 might mention elements alluding to Yahweh's victory over the sea, with the "molten sea" representing defeated Yam.

== Phoenician attestations ==
No references to Yam occur in any Phoenician inscriptions, though it has been proposed that he is mentioned by Philo of Byblos under the name Pontos. Philo presented his account of Phoenician mythology, Phoenician History, as a Greek a translation of an original written by Sanchuniathon. Today it is assumed to be a combination of elements from various Phoenician and Greco-Roman traditions. Its character is euhemeristic, and all mythical figures are presented as either mortals deified due to extraordinary achievements, or forces of nature. Pontos is among the figures referred to as mortals. He is described as a son of Nereus, which constitutes a reversal of the relation between the deities bearing these names in Greek mythology. Most likely due to mistaken quotation, either by Philo from his sources or by Eusebius from Philo, Pontos is also described both as a grandson and a contemporary of Zeus Belos. He is himself the father of two children, Poseidon and Sidon. The latter most likely should be understood as an eponymous goddess of the city of Sidon. Philo credits her with the invention of hymns, but it is possible she was also a marine deity herself. Ouranos waged war on Pontos with the help of Demarous, though the latter was unsuccessful and had to make an offering to the sea god to flee. While attempts have been made to prove that Pontos should be understood as an ally of Kronos (El) in this context, there is no direct support for this proposal in the text. In another passage Philo relays that Pontos' mortal remains were consecrated in Byblos by Poseidon, the Kabeiroi, the Agrotai and the Halieis. The basis for this passage is unknown, and while it has been compared to an account of the consecration of Osiris' body in Byblos in Plutarch's De Iside et Osiride, the location is not the same and a connection cannot be proven.

The identification of Philo's Pontos as a late version of Yam is supported by the account of his conflict with Demarous, corresponding to Baal, and by the analogous meaning of his name, which can be translated from Greek as "sea". Albert I. Baumgarten has proposed that Poseidon also corresponds to Yam, as according to him "a single Semitic deity might, in different places, be identified with different Greek gods and vice versa" in Philo's writings. However, as argued by Aaron J. Brody, the Phoenician deity whose interpretatio graeca was Poseidon, who is also attested in other sources, does not correspond to Yam. His native identity remains unknown due to lack references in bilingual texts, but he was most likely a protective deity of sailors.

== Comparative mythology ==
In past scholarship, the conflict between Yam and Baal in the Ugaritic Baal Cycle has been understood as a cosmogonic battle, as argued for example by Frank Moore Cross, and as such has been compared to the Mesopotamian myth Enūma Eliš. Multiple authors have described the battle between Yam and Baal as an example of the chaoskampf motif. Researchers such as William F. Albright treated Yam and Tiamat as essentially analogous. The scholarly consensus gradually started to shift in the 1990s, with objections occasionally made earlier, for example by Jonas C. Greenfield. While the combat motif is shared by both myths, the Baal Cycle does not represent an example of a narrative focused on a younger generation of gods supplanting an older one. In contrast with Tiamat, Yam was not understood as a primordial deity, but rather as an actively worshiped god belonging to the same generation as Baal. As noted by Aaron Tugendhaft, the conflict in the Baal Cycle takes place within an already established hierarchy of deities, and while Baal acquires kingship by defeating Yam, his rule is not exclusive. He is also not recognized as a king before this event, in contrast with Tiamat's opponent Marduk. Additionally, the victory over Yam does not automatically make him the king of the gods, and he still must appeal to El to be granted a house like the other members of the pantheon. Furthermore, he requires the help of Kothar-wa-Khasis and support of Ashtart to attain victory over Yam, something that finds no parallel in the story of Marduk. Yam is also not portrayed as a cosmic threat, in contrast with Tiamat, and his actions do not threaten the divine council or the universe. Brendan C. Benz has also argued that even the "chaoskampf" label is incorrect, as according to him the Baal Cycle does not revolve around a struggle against chaos, and Yam does not function as a force of disorder, but rather as a legitimate contender to the rank of king of the gods. The battle of Yam and Baal also does not result in creation. The scene of division of Tiamat's body finds no parallel in Ugaritic literature. Today the view that Baal Cycle is a cosmogony is generally no longer accepted, and it is assumed that this composition and Enūma Eliš constitute examples of adaptations of a motif first attested in Mari. In addition to the narrative differences, it has also been pointed out that in contrast with Yam, Tiamat was never understood as an actively worshiped deity and did not receive offerings.

While no parallel to Yam has been identified among Mesopotamian deities, it has been pointed out that similarities exist between him and the Hurrian sea god, Kiaše. In Hurrian offering list from Ugarit, he occupies a position comparable to Yam in these written in Ugaritic. Furthermore, a myth focused on him, the Song of the Sea, deals with similar themes as the Yam section of the Baal Cycle. Its central theme is the conflict between a weather god, Teššub, and the sea god. The performance of the Song of the Sea was linked to the ritual role of Mount Saphon, referred to as Ḫazzi in this context. Meindert Dijkstra additionally notes the Hurrian myth of Ḫedammu, a sea monster similarly portrayed as an enemy of the weather god, can be considered a close parallel of the conflict involving Yam in Ugaritic mythology.
