= List of Ugaritic deities =

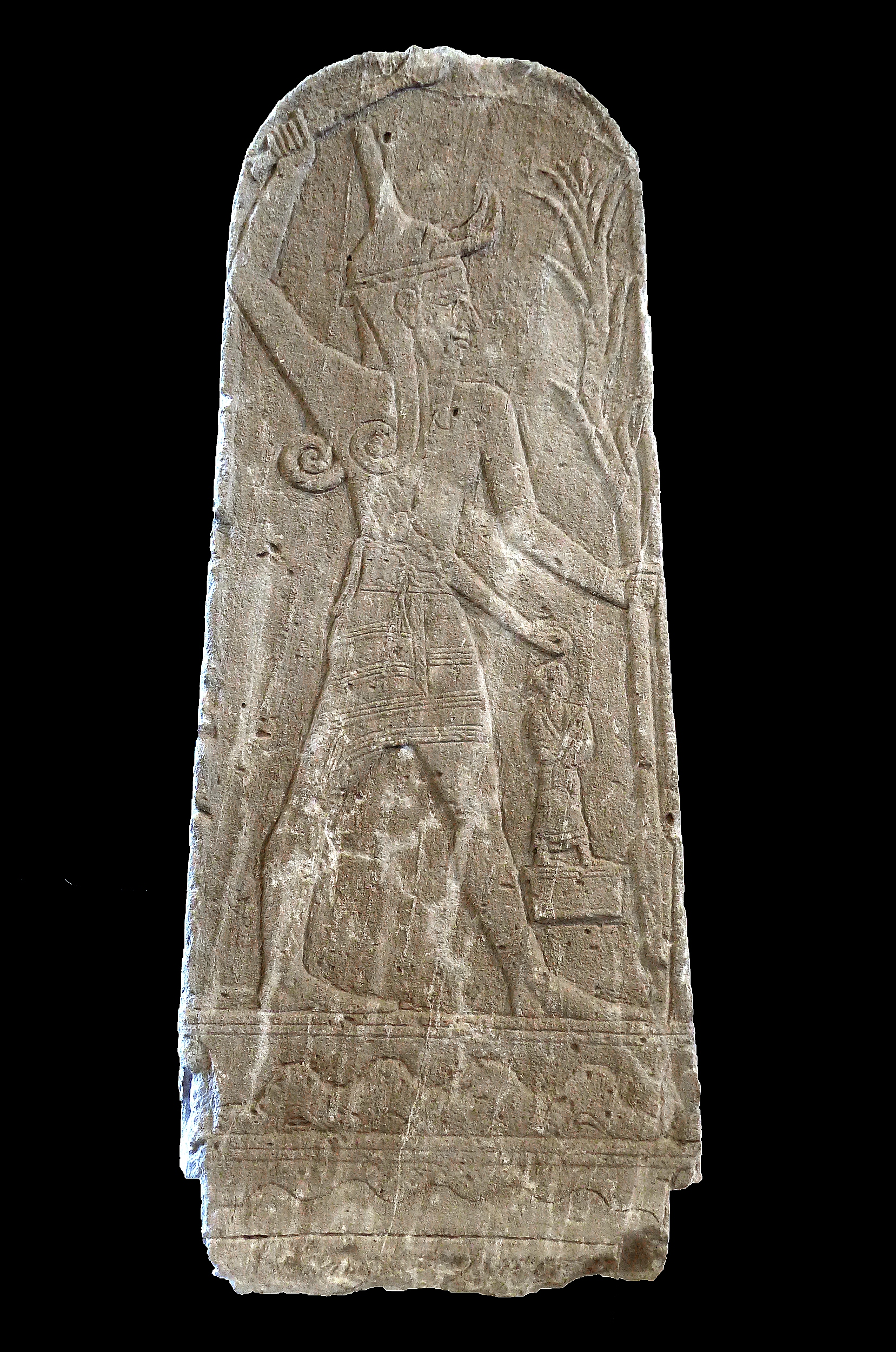
The stela known as Baal with Thunderbolt, a well known depiction of one of the main gods of Ugarit.

The Ugaritic pantheon included deities of local origin, many of whom are also known from Eblaite sources from the third millennium BCE or Amorite ones from the early second millennium BCE, as well as Hurrian and Mesopotamian ones. The Ugaritic pantheon is considered better documented than other aspects of Ugaritic religion, such as the life of the clergy or the social context of various offerings. Over two hundred names of deities are known from Ugaritic texts, though it has been argued the number of these who were an object of active worship was lower. Many of the names are binomial, and as such may refer either to a single deity and their epithet, to two deities syncretized into one, or to a closely associated pair.

The presence of Hurrian deities in the pantheon is considered one of the main differences between the religion of the inhabitants of Ugarit and those known from other areas inhabited by speakers of Northwest Semitic languages, for example Canaan, understood by researchers of Ancient Near Eastern religions as the area between Byblos and Gaza. It has been suggested that it is not possible to divide the gods worshiped into this city into separate Ugaritic and Hurrian pantheons.

The iconography of most Ugaritic deities is presently unknown due to lack of inscriptions identifying their depictions.

== Major deities ==
Name	Alphabetic writing	Details
Baal Hadad	b'l hd(d)	The name Baal ("lord") and its cognates (such as Akkadian bēlu) designated various deities in different time periods and locations in the Ancient Near East. The Ugaritic Baal was a weather god. He was portrayed as an active deity acting as the king of the gods, though it has been argued his position was subordinate to that of the inactive El. At the same time, he was the most popular deity invoked in theophoric names, which might indicate that he was understood as the main deity of the city. It has been noted that it is not impossible that both gods were viewed as heads of the pantheon, each with different functions. Baal most likely developed as an epithet of a form of the weather god Hadad which became his primary name on the Mediterranean coast in the middle of the second millennium BCE. The original name, Haddu/Hadad, remained in use but was secondary, and functioned as if it were an epithet. In contrast, while "Baal" functioned as an epithet of the weather god as far east as Emar, it never became his main name in inland Syria. In the Ugaritic texts, Baal is second only to El when it comes to the number of epithets applied to him, with as many as fourteen individual ones attested. The most frequent is "the mighty one" ('al'iyn). Only one epithet, "the rider of the clouds" (rkb 'rpt) is related to his role as a weather deity. Multiple hypostases of Baal were worshiped in Ugarit according to ritual texts, including "Baal of Aleppo" corresponding to the weather god of that city. However, Baal of Saphon (the Ugaritic name of Jebel al-Aqra) was most likely understood as the primary manifestation. A series of Ugaritic myths known as the "Baal Cycle" describes Baal's struggle to attain kingship among the gods and his battles against various rivals, especially the sea god Yam. Baal does not challenge El directly in any myths, though it has been argued that tensions between them are implicit due to Baal's opponents owing their positions to El. Baal most likely had no permanent spouse, though it has been argued that he was associated with both Anat and Ashtart in some capacity. The use of the name Baal to designate a weather god is also attested in Phoenician texts postdating the destruction of Ugarit.
El	'il	El was the head of the Ugaritic pantheon. He was regarded as a creator deity and was addressed as the father of the other gods and of mankind. He was also the king (mlk) of the gods. His dwelling is described as "the source of the rivers, in the midst of the confluence of the two deeps". El also appears in the Hurrian offering lists from Ugarit. He continued to be venerated in the first millennium BCE, and is mentioned in many other sources, for example in the Phoenician Azatiwada inscription (Karatepe bilingual) and in Aramaic texts from Palmyra. However, he is absent from the pantheons of Ebla and Akkad from the third millennium BCE. The Akkadian cognate of his name, ilu, has the same meaning, "god", but did not designate a specific deity. In Ebla the word il was used in theophoric names as a stand-in for the names of individual deities. Alfonso Archi proposes that El only developed in the second millennium BCE among speakers of West Semitic languages under the influence of Mesopotamian and Hurrian beliefs about successive generations of ancestral deities.
Anat	'nt	Anat was a war goddess. She shared this domain with other deities. Her warlike character has been described as an inversion of gender norms which applied to mortal women. Dennis Pardee informally characterizes her as a "tomboy goddess". In myths she is the main ally of Baal. She was believed to reside on the mountain Inbubu (inbb), whose location is unknown, though references to "Anat of Saphon" are known too. Anat's name is often assumed to be a cognate of the Arabic word 'anwat, "force". Wilfred G. Lambert instead proposed that it was derived from Ḫanât, a goddess worshiped by Ḫana, a nomadic Amorite group known from the texts from Mari. She could be described as winged, and this trait is often used to identify possible depictions of her. Anat also appears in the Hurrian offering lists from Ugarit, possibly because she had no close counterpart among the Hurrian deities.
Ashtart	'ṯtrt	Ashtart's name was the western cognate of Mesopotamian Ishtar. The earliest attestations of this goddess go back to the third millennium BCE, when she was worshiped in Ebla under the name Ašdar. In some cities, for example Mari (which is designated as her cult center in Ugaritic texts) the names Ashtart and Ishtar could be treated as interchangeable. It has been argued that she was characterized by pugnacity. She was closely associated with hunting. Additionally, like Anat, she was regarded as a warrior goddess, which is considered an inversion of gender norms which applied to mortal women. While the evidence is not entirely conclusive, it is assumed that Ashtart was one of the higher ranked goddesses in the pantheon of Ugarit. She does not play a larger role in Ugaritic myths on her. An exception is the text "The Hunt of the Goddess", in which she is the central character. Ashtart's association with Baal and Anat is well attested. Two passages refer to her as "Ashtart of the name of Baal", while a text from outside Ugarit refers to her as "face of Baal". In a single ritual text, Ashtart and Anat appear as a single entry with the binomial name Anat-wa-Ashtart. It is agreed that the worship of Ashtart was of some importance to the royal family of Ugarit, especially when it comes to her hypostasis Ashtart-Šadi, "Ashtart of the steppe". It is also often assumed that she was an astral deity representing the evening star, but there is no direct evidence for this in any Bronze Age texts written in any Western Semitic language.
Athirat Elat?	aṯrt 'ilt	Athirat was the highest ranked goddess in the Ugaritic pantheon. She was regarded as the spouse of El and it has been proposed she could be referred to as Elat, though this name might also be a generic word, "goddess". The Ugaritic texts are the only known source providing detailed information about her as a mythical figure. She was addressed as "Lady Athirat of the Sea" and "creatress of the gods". No depictions of her are known, though based on textual sources it is assumed that she would be portrayed as a "senior seated lady dressed in a long robe blessing the gods and people", and at least one such a figure of an Ugaritic goddess is known. Information about Athirat from outside Ugarit is scarce. A goddess of Amorite origin with an etymologically related name, Ashratum, was worshiped in Mesopotamia, but her character and position in the pantheon were not similar. Another possibly related goddess was worshiped in Qataban (part of modern Yemen). The similar biblical term asherah refers primarily to an object, but most likely also functioned as the name of a deity.
Kothar-wa-Khasis Hayyānu	kṯr w ḫss hyy	Kothar-wa-Khasis was a craftsman god. His name can be translated as "skilled and intelligent". His alternate name, Hayyānu, which occurs in parallel with his regular name, might be derived from the Hurrian form of the name of the god Ea, and is not attested as a common noun in Ugaritic texts. In myths his residences are Caphtor (Crete) and Memphis. In the Baal Cycle, he creates the weapons Baal uses in his battle against Yam and later builds his palace. In the Epic of Aqhat, he is the creator of the bow of the eponymous hero.
Kotharat	kṯrt	Kotharat were a group of seven goddesses regarded as divine midwives. Their collective name is derived from the root kṯr, "wise" or "cunning", same as the name of Kothar, and can be translated as "the skilled". It is possible that they also had individual names, with the six proposed ones including tlḫhw, mlghy, bq't (possibly "she who forces open [the womb]"), tq't, prbḫt and dmqt (possibly "the good one"), though there is no agreement regarding this and it has been suggested some of the words which can be interpreted this way are only common nouns. They were originally worshiped in the middle Euphrates area and in Mari, as attested in texts from the early second millennium BCE. They are also attested in texts from Emar under the name Ilû kašārati (DINGIR^{MEŜ} ka-ša-ra-ti).
Nikkal(-wa-Ib)	nkl (w ib)	Nikkal, a derivative of Mesopotamian Ningal, appears in both Ugaritic and Hurrian sources from Ugarit. She was considered one of the principal goddesses of Ugarit, comparable in rank to Shapash or Anat. She was the wife of the moon god, Yarikh, similar to how her Mesopotamian forerunner was married to Nanna. Nikkal could also be called Nikkal-wa-Ib, with the second element often translated as "fruit". Dennis Pardee suggests that Ib (Ibbu) was originally a separate deity who came to be identified with Nikkal, but Steve A. Wiggins instead argues that it is likely this title was derived from an analogous epithet of Nanna. She is attested in five theophoric names from Ugarit, some of which are etymologically Hurrian. Ugarit is the only Syrian city in which the worship of Nikkal is directly attested in the second millennium BCE, though Ugaritic documents indicate that she was also worshiped in two towns close to Carchemish.
Resheph Iršappa	ršp eršp	Resheph was a god associated with war, plague, the underworld and the planet Mars. His name was derived from the root ršp, and as such is a cognate of an element of Amorite personal names meaning "to flame". However, the relation between the meaning of the name and the nature of the god is not entirely clear. He plays no major role in any Ugaritic myths, but nonetheless appears in many other types of texts. He is one of the deities most commonly invoked in Ugaritic theophoric names. Iršappa, the Hurrian form of his name, is also attested in them. Hurrians regarded him as a god of the marketplace. In the first millennium BCE he was worshiped by Phoenicians in Sidon, and was also introduced by them to Kition on Cyprus.
Shapash	špš	Shapash was the Ugaritic sun goddess. Her name is a cognate of that of the Mesopotamian sun god Shamash. She was called the "lamp of the gods" (nrt 'ilm). She appears in sixty six known theophoric names, more than any other goddess. Only El, Baal, Resheph and the Hurrian god Teshub appear in a greater number of names. In myths and incantations, she acts as a messenger, and summons other gods from distant locations. As an extension of this role, she could also be described as acting as a guide in the underworld. Known texts characterize her as a compassionate deity. She was regarded as a daughter of El and acted as his messenger. While a figure named pḥlt (who might be either a deity, a human or a horse) addresses her as "mother" in an incantation, it is most likely only a honorific in this case, and not a genealogical statement. In the Baal cycle, she informs Attar that El has selected Yam for kingship, and later announces to Mot that his struggle against Baal is futile, because the latter gained El's support. In both cases, due to her authority instructions she gives are obeyed without question. For uncertain reason, this cycle of myths ends with a hymn dedicated to her.
Yarikh	yrḫ	Yarikh was the Ugaritic moon god. His name means "moon" and has cognates in many other Semitic languages, such as Akkadian warḫum ("month"), Amorite Yeraḫ (name of a lunar deity, common in theophoric names) and Hebrew yariḫ ("moon") and yarḫ ("month"). One of the Ugaritic texts identifies the cult center of Yarikh as the settlement lrgt, possibly to be identified with Larugadu, the cult center of Hadabal known from Eblaite texts. One of the known Ugaritic myths describes the circumstances of his marriage to Nikkal.

== Deities prominent in the Baal Cycle ==
Name	Alphabetic writing	Details
Arsay	'arṣy	Arsay was one of the goddesses regarded as daughters of Baal. Her name is assumed to mean "earthy". She is addressed as the "daughter of y'bdr", a word of unknown meaning. In god lists, offering lists and most passages from the Baal Cycle she and her siblings do not occur together. One of the god lists identifies her with Allatum (Allani), an underworld goddess, and it has been proposed her own character was similar. However, due to scarcity of references the exact rationale behind this association remains unknown.
Attar	'ṯtr	Attar's name is a cognate of Ashtart's, but they were not associated with each other. He was regarded as a war god. It has also been proposed that he was responsible for irrigation. His epithet 'rẓ is conventionally translated as "the terrible", often pejoratively, or even as "the tyrant", but according to Aicha Rahmouni it might mean "the mighty", with no pejorative undertones. In the Baal cycle, Athirat proclaims Attar the new king of the gods in place of the deceased Baal, but he turns out to be incapable of ruling and eventually the resurrected weather god returns to his old position.
Gupan-wa-Ugar	gpn w 'ugr	Gupan and Ugar, who typically occur together as Gupan-wa-Ugar, were messengers of Baal. Their names mean "vine" and "field", respectively. In the Baal Cycle, they carry messages between the eponymous protagonist and other deities, such as Anat or Mot.
Mot	mt	Mot was the god or personification of death. He does not appear in any ritual texts, only in myths (due to being described as a harmful deity whom one must take precautions for rituals). He has also been compared to Namtar. At the same time, Mot's mythical role as an opponent of Baal (and Anat) is unique to Ugaritic mythology, and has no parallel in traditions about the other weather gods of the Ancient Near East, such as Teshub.
Pidray	pdry	Pidray was one of the goddesses considered to be daughters of Baal, as attested in the Baal Cycle and in Marriage of Nikkal and Yarikh. She appears in known texts more frequently than the other goddesses belonging to this category. The meaning of her name is unknown. It has been suggested that it might mean "fatty" due to its similarity to the rarely used Hebrew word peder, "renal fat", but this proposal is not universally accepted. She was addressed as the "daughter of light". While it is sometimes proposed that her epithet might hint at a connection with lightning, neither the Ugaritic word nor its Akkadian, Arabic and Hebrew cognates are used to specifically refer to this phenomenon, making this proposal implausible. There is also no direct evidence that she was regarded as a weather goddess. She was worshiped in the royal palace. A festival focused on her is also attested. Two of the texts which mention her appear to include Hurrian elements. A god list equates her with Hebat, the wife of the Hurrian weather god Teshub, but according to Daniel Schwemer this is unlikely to be an indication that she was viewed as Baal's wife. Only a single reference to Pidray from outside Ugarit is known: an Aramaic papyrus from Egypt from a later period mentions "Pidray of Raphia" next to "Baal of Saphon".
Qudšu-wa-Amrur	qdš w amrr	Qudšu-wa-Amrur was a minor deity considered to be Athirat's messenger, as attested in the Baal Cycle. He is also addressed as her fisherman, possibly a referecent to her well attested connection with the sea. Terms referring to fishermen are also attested as epithets of Mesopotamian deities. Additionally, some temples in that area employed fishermen to provide them with fish which could be offered to the gods.
Tallay	ṭly	Tallay's name can be translated as "dewy" and it is possible she was a weather deity, most likely connected with dew and light rain. She was addressed as "daughter of drizzle". In a passage from the Baal Cycle, she is listed among Baal's daughters alongside Arsay and Pidray. However, the three of them do not occur together otherwise, though Tallay and Pidray alone are attested as a pair in multiple passages from the same work. Only one possible reference to Tallay from outside the Baal Cycle has been identified.
Yam Nahar	ym nhr	Yam was the god of the sea. He could also be addressed as Nahar, "river". It has been suggested that this name originally referred to a separate deity, possibly associated with river ordeal like Mesopotamian Idlurugu. While he was actively worshiped, his rank in the pantheon was low. He is nonetheless present in theophoric names from Ugarit. Non-Ugaritic attestations of Yam come from Emar (where he appears as one of the deities celebrated in the local festival zukru) and Egypt (literary texts). No direct reference to Yam is known from any later Phoenician texts, though it has been suggested that "Pontos" known from the writings of Philo of Byblos might correspond to him.

== Minor deities ==
Name	Alphabetic writing	Details
Arṣu-wa-Šamuma	'arṣ w šmm	The double deity Arsu-wa-Shamuma ("Earth and Heaven") appears only in ritual texts. The ordering of earth before heaven reflects a Hurrian tradition.
Ba'alat Bahatīma	b'lt bhtm	Ba'alat Bahatima, the "lady of the houses" or possibly "lady of the palace", might have been the goddess responsible for the area inhabited by the royal family. It is not certain if she was an epithet of another goddess (Anat and Athirat have been proposed) or an independent deity. It is possible that she corresponded to Mesopotamian Belet Ekallim (Ninegal). The Hurrian form of Ninegal, Pendigalli, was also worshiped in Ugarit.
Dadmiš Tadmiš	ddmš	The goddess Dadmiš is attested in both Ugaritic and Hurrian ritual texts. Dennis Pardee assumes that she was a healing deity. In god lists she appears in the immediate proximity of Resheph, and Manfred Krebernik tentatively proposes she was an underworld deity and his spouse. Her origin remains uncertain. One proposal derives her name from the Akkadian word dādmu, "dwellings". A cognate of this term, Dadmum, was used by Amorites to refer to the area around Aleppo in the Old Babylonian period and possibly later in Ugarit as well, as evidenced by the term ddm, which might have referred to an inhabitant of this area. It has also been proposed that Dadmiš is related to the Mesopotamian goddess Tadmuštum, who was associated with the underworld and deities such as Nergal, Šubula and Laṣ. However, the Ugaritic edition of the Weidner god list equates her with Shuzianna.
Dagan	dgn	Dagan was the head of the pantheon of the middle Euphrates area, but he does not appear frequently in the Ugaritic literary texts. He is directly referred to as Baal's father in twelve passages. While Baal was also references as a son of El, Aicha Rahmouni proposes that these statements are not necessarily contradictory, as it possible that El was understood as the creator of all deities, and thus their metaphorical father, while Dagan was regarded as Baal's biological father. He is relatively well represented in offering lists, but there is no indication that he was regarded as a major deity. In incantations he appears alongside Baal. Texts from Ugarit, including the myth Marriage of Nikkal and Yarikh, associate him with Tuttul, which was already recognized as his cult center in Ebla in the third millennium BCE.
Dimgay	dmgy	Dimgay was a minor goddess regarded as the handmaiden of Athirat. The etymology of her name is uncertain. In a single passage she occurs in parallel with Talish, the handmaiden of Yarikh, and it is sometimes proposed they were a single deity with a binomial name (dmg w tlš, Dimgay-wa-Talish).
Didānu	ddn	Didānu appears in the Epic of Kirta as the deified ancestor of the eponymous king. He most likely was also regarded as the divine ancestor of the Ugaritic kings.
Gaṯaru	gṯr	Gaṯaru, "the powerful", was a god associated with the underworld. Dennis Pardee proposes that additionally on comparative grounds it can be assumed he was associated with vegetation and warfare. A cognate of his name functioned as an epithet of Anat. He was also worshiped in Emar and Mari, and in Mesopotamia, where came to be associated with Lugalirra.
Gūrūma-wa-Tahāmātu	grm w thmt	Gūrūma-wa-Tahāmātu, "mountains and waters-of-the-abyss", represented mountains and freshwater springs located in the proximity of Ugarit. The name is grammatically plural in Ugaritic.
Hargub	hrgb	It is assumed Hargub was a minor god whose form was regarded as bird-like. The meaning of his name is unknown, though it has been proposed it was derived from the name of a type of large bird. In a single passage he is addressed as the "father of raptors", 'ab nšrm, nšrm being a generic word for a bird of prey. A similar epithet, "lord of the eagles" (Eblaite: BE Á^{mušen} Á^{mušen}) is known from the Ebla texts, where it refers to Adarwan, regarded as either a deity or as a "numen" of the god Ammarik.
Horon	ḥrn	Horon was a god associated with magic and exorcisms. He is primarily known from incantations. It has been argued that he was associated with the underworld. However, according to Manfred Krebernik there is no direct evidence supporting this view. In the Epic of Kirta, he is invoked by the eponymous king in a curse.
Hulelu^{?}	hll	Hll was the father of the Kotharat. The vocalization of his name is not certain, though Hulelu has been proposed based on the presence of a deity bearing this name in the pantheon of Emar. The origin of the latter is not known. A connection with the Arabic word hilālun, "crescent moon", has been proposed, and on this basis he is often considered an astral deity, perhaps a divine representation of the lunar crescent. An alternative proposal connects Hll with Mesopotamian Enlil. His epithet b'l gml is usually translated as "lord of the crescent moon" or "lord of the sickle", but Aicha Rahmouni proposes "possessor of the gamlu staff". She points out that while the gml/gamlu is well attested as a divine attribute, it was most likely a curved staff and not a sickle or sickle-like sword.
Ḫiriḫibi	ḫrḫb	Ḫiriḫibi is only attested in the myth Marriage of Nikkal and Yarikh. He was most likely a deity of Hurrian origin. The translation "he of the mountain Ḫiriḫ(i)", has been proposed for his name. The widely accepted vocalization gives the name the Hurrian suffix -bi, attested in the names of Hurrian deities such as Kumarbi and Nabarbi. He was regarded as a divine marriage broker. He is also addressed as the "king of summer" or "divine patron of summer" (mlk qẓ). It is possible that he was Nikkal's father, though the available evidence supporting this view is indirect.
Ilib	'il'ib	Ilib appears before El, Dagan and Baal in Ugaritic offering lists. It is uncertain if he should be interpreted as a divine ancestor, "god the father", or as a divine representation of the concept of a clan god. Hurrian offering lists from Ugarit attest the existence of a Hurrian translation of the name of this deity, eni ettanni, "god father", who was a "generic ancestor of the gods".
Ilish	'ilš	Ilish was a minor god regarded as the "herald of the house of Baal". He was believed to have multiple wives, referred to as the "herald goddesses" (ngrt 'ilht). The etymology of his name is unknown and its vocalization remains uncertain due to only relying on a similar Akkadian personal name which might be an etymologically unrelated hypocoristic.
Kinnaru	knr	Kinnaru was the deification of the lyre. The name was identical with the ordinary word designating this instrument.
Maḏḏara	mḏr	Maḏḏara is attested in offering lists, but the nature and origin of this deity are unknown. Based on the syllabic writing of the name, ^{d}ma-za-ra, a connection with the Hurrian word maziri, "help", has been tentatively suggested, though the similarity might be a coincidence.
Messengers of Yam	mlak ym	In the Baal Cycle, two unnamed deities serve as messengers of Yam. They are also addressed as "the embassy of judge Nahar" (t'dt ṯpṭ nhr). A single reference to an unidentified deity addressed as "servant of Yam" or "youth of Yam" (gml ym) is also known from the Epic of Kirta. Manfred Krebernik suggests it might be the name of a sea monster or a poetic way to refer to a wave.
Mêšaru	mšr	Mêšaru ("rectitude" or "uprightness") is attested in a single text alongside Ṣidqu. It is presumed he was a divine judge.
Milku	mlk	Milku was a god associated with the underworld, possibly regarded as its ruler. His name is a cognate of the word malku, "king". A Hurrian form, Milkunni, is also attested. He could be addressed as "the eternal king" (mlk 'lm). Epithets containing the word "king" do not necessarily indicate the deity was regarded as high-ranked.
Pidar	pdr	Pidar was a god associated with Baal. It has been proposed that his name was derived from the Hurrian word pedari, "bull". A proposal now considered less likely considers it identical with the Ugarit word pdr, "city". It might also be etymologically related to Pidray's. He is attested in theophoric names, offering lists and literary texts.
Qudshu	qdš	There is no agreement in scholarship over whether qdš ("holy") represents a goddess analogous to Egyptian Qetesh or if this word should merely be considered an epithet. The notion that this term refers to a "sacred prostitute" is considered discredited. No direct references to a goddess named qdš are actually present in Ugaritic texts, and the existence of this goddess is presumed only based on a distinct iconographic type. The "Qudshu" figure is particularly common on metal pendants from Ugarit. As an epithet, qdš is used to describe the god El in three known passages.
Rahmay	rḥmy	Rahmay was a goddess associated with Athirat. It is assumed that her name is derived from the word raḥmu, "womb". While it has been proposed in the past that she was not a separate goddess but a byname of Athirat or an epithet of Anat, neither assumption finds support in known Ugaritic texts.
Samal	ṣml	It is assumed Samal was a minor goddess whose form was considered to be bird-like. The etymology of her name is unknown, and Aicha Rahmouni notes that most proposals are implausible and "have an unmistakable air of desperation". In a single passage she is addressed as the "mother of raptors", 'um nšrm, nšrm being a generic word for a bird of prey.
Shahar	šḥr	Shahar's name means "dawn". He does not appear in any Ugaritic texts on his own, only alongside Shalim.
Shalim	šlm	Shalim's name means "dusk". He is attested on his own in offering lists, but Shahar only appears as a part of the binomial name Shahar-wa-Shalim. Shalim was most likely regarded as the youngest son of El, and his mother was not Athirat.
Shatiqatu	š'tqt	Shatiqatu was a mythical female exorcist and healer most commonly identified in modern scholarship as a goddess. However, she is absent from known offering lists and god lists. On this basis, as an alternative to the most common interpretation it has been proposed that she might have been an apkallu-like figure or even a human. She appears in the Epic of Kirta, where she heals the eponymous ruler by expelling the disease (or demon) from him with a staff. She is described as a creation of El. Her name is derived from the root 'tq, "to pass" or "to move".
Sumuqan^{?}	ṯmq	The god ṯmq occurs in theophoric names and in a literary passage referring to him as the "warrior of Baal" (mhr b'l) and "warrior of Anat" (mhr 'nt). It has been suggested that he should be identified as the Mesopotamian god Sumuqan, who was associated with wild animals, but could also be referred to as a warrior (Akkadian: qarrādu).
^{d}Su-ra-su-gu-WA	not available	The deity ^{d}Su-ra-su-gu-WA (reading of the final sign uncertain) is only known from a single offering list written in the syllabic cuneiform script. The name might have Hurrian origin.
Šaggar(-wa-'Iṯum)	šgr(w 'iṯm)	Šaggar was the divine representation of the Sinjar Mountains, and likely additionally also a lunar deity. He was already worshiped in Ebla in the third millennium BCE. He also belonged to the pantheons of Mari, Kurda, Tell Leilan and Emar. In Ugarit he was paired with the deity 'Iṯum, and in an offering list they appear together as Šaggar-wa-'Iṯum. Most likely they were usually treated as separate deities and only appear as a pair due to a shared function. It has been suggested that they were responsible for "mixed herds of sheep and goats". It has also been proposed that 'Iṯum corresponded to Mesopotamian Ishum.
Šamnu	šmn	The name of the deity Šamnu is identical with a word referring to oil, most likely olive oil.
Šaraššiya	ṯrṯy	The god Šaraššiya is only attested in offering lists, where he follows Baal of Saphon and Baal of Aleppo. Daniel Schwemer proposes that his name was derived from the Hurrian word šarašše-, "kingship", and that he was a divine personification of this concept. The term šaraššiya, "for kingship", is well attested as a description of offerings in Hurro-Hittite texts.
Ṣidqu	ṣdq	Ṣidqu ("righteousness") is only attested in a single text, in which he appears alongside Mêšaru.
Talish	tlš	Talish was a goddess regarded as the handmaiden of Yarikh. However, the moon god does not appear in the preserved sections of the text addressing her as such. Multiple etymologies for the name have been proposed, including derivation from a verb meaning "to knead" and from a word possibly meaning "tardy" or "delay". It is also possible that it did not originate in any Semitic language, as a similar personal name, Tu-li-ša, is known from Akkadian texts not only from Ugarit, but also Nuzi. In a single passage she occurs in parallel with Dimgay, the handmaiden of Athirat, and it is sometimes proposed they were the same deity whose name was in reality binomial (dmg w tlš, Dimgay-wa-Talish).
Ṯukamuna-wa-Šunama	ṯkmn w šnm	Ṯukamuna-wa-Šunama (Thukamuna and Shunama) were two gods who were sons of El and Athirat, possibly regarded as the youngest among their children. In a myth preserved on the tablet KTU 1.114, the two of them help El go back home after he gets drunk during a feast. They are also mentioned in offering lists. It has been proposed that they were related to the Kassite deities Shuqamuna and Shumaliya, with the latter pair possibly derived from gods with linguistically Semitic (rather than Kassite) names, but this proposal remains speculative.
Tiraṯu	trṯ	Tiraṯu, "young wine", was the god of wine. The name of the Mesopotamian goddess Siraš is an Akkadian cognate of Ugaritic trṯ, but she was associated with beer, not wine. A further deity with an etymologically related name, ^{d}zi-la-šu, is attested in an offering list from Ebla, but according to Manfred Krebernik should be considered analogous to the Mesopotamian goddess. Another cognate of the name is the ordinary Hebrew noun tīrōš.
Uṯḫatu	'uṯḫt	Uṯḫatu was the deification of a ritual censer.
Yaparudmay	ybrdmy	In the myth Marriage of Nikkal and Yarikh, Yaparudmay is mentioned alongside Pidray as one of the goddesses Yarikh could marry instead of Nikkal. She is not otherwise attested in any Ugaritic texts. It has been suggested that she was a sister of Attar. Steve A. Wiggins instead proposes that she was regarded as his daughter. Wilfred G. E. Watson interprets her as a daughter of Baal. Gabriele Theuer notes it is not impossible that she was not a separate goddess, but rather an epithet of Pidray.
Ẓiẓẓu-wa-Kāmaṯu	ẓẓ w kmṯ	Ẓiẓẓu-wa-Kāmaṯu only appear as a pair. The meaning of Ẓiẓẓu's name and the character of this deity are not known. Kāmaṯu is a cognate of the name of the god Chemosh worshiped in Moab in the first millennium BCE. According to Wilfred G. Lambert it is uncertain if he corresponds to the god Kamiš known from Eblaite texts and Kammuš, a name of Nergal known from Mesopotamian god lists.

== Hurrian deities ==
Name	Alphabetic writing	Details
Adamma	adm	Adamma was originally a spouse of Resheph in the Eblaite pantheon, but after the fall of Ebla she was incorporated into Hurrian religion. She was associated with Kubaba. They appear together in a Hurrian offering list from Ugarit.
Allani	aln	Allani was a Hurrian goddess regarded as the queen of the underworld. She is attested in Hurrian offering lists from Ugarit, where she appears alongside Išḫara.
Aštabi Attapar?	aštb	Aštabi was originally worshiped in Ebla and other nearby settlements in the third millennium BCE. His original character is unknown, but in later Hurrian sources he was regarded as a warrior god. While in Ugarit he appears in Hurrian offering lists, it is possible that he did not exclusively belong to the Hurrian milieu in this city. Alfonso Archi additionally assumes that the god Attapar (or Attapal; 'tṭpr/'tṭpl), who formed a pair with Attar, was the same deity as Aštabi, but Dennis Pardee considers him to be a distinct form of Attar himself instead.
Daqitu	dqt	Daqitu, also known as Takitu, was a minor Hurrian goddess regarded as an attendant of Hebat. Based on the Ugaritic writing of her name, dqt, it has been proposed that it was derived from the root dqq, "small", present in Semitic languages. She is attested in Hurrian offering lists from Ugarit, where she follows Hebat.
Ea	iy	The god Ea, who originated in Mesopotamia, is well attested in Ugaritic theophoric names. According to Dennis Pardee, Ea in Ugarit he should be understood as the Hurrian form of this deity.
Ebrimuša	ebrmž	Ebrimuša was a god who belonged to the retinue of Hebat. His name can be translated as "lord of justice".
Hebat	ḫbt	Hebat was the wife of Teshub, the head of the Hurrian pantheon. She appears in Hurrian offering lists from Ugarit and in 15 theophoric names known from Ugaritic documents, though one of them did not belong to an inhabitant of the city.
Hutena and Hutellura	ḫdn ḫdlr	Hutena and Hutellura were Hurrian goddesses of fate and divine midwives. They can appear both together and individually. They are attested in Hurrian offering lists from Ugarit.
Išḫara	'ušḫr(y)	Išḫara was a Syrian goddess already worshiped in Ebla in the third millennium BCE. She was later incorporated into the Hurrian pantheon. She was associated with the underworld and divination. In Ugarit she appears in both Ugaritic and Hurrian documents. One of them mentions a king making a sacrifice to 'ušḫr-ḫlmẓ, ḫlmẓ being often understood as an epithet meaning "the serpent" or "the lizard". She also appears in association with Ashtart.
Kiaše	kyḏ	Kiaše was the Hurrian god representing the sea. He appears in Hurrian offering lists from Ugarit. It has been pointed out that the perception of the sea in Ugaritic religion, while dissimilar to Mesopotamian traditions, is similar to that known from Hurrian sources.
Kubaba	kbb	Kubaba was a goddess of unknown origin, first attested in sources pertaining to Carchemish from the early second millennium BCE. In Ugarit she appears in Hurrian offering lists and in two theophoric names.
Kumarbi	kmrb	Kumarbi was the Hurrian "father of gods". He appears in Hurrian offering lists from Ugarit. It has been pointed out that even though god lists treat him and El as analogous to each other, they received offerings separately.
Kušuḫ	kzg	Kušuḫ was the Hurrian moon god. In Hurrian texts from Ugarit he is addressed as the "king of the (oracular) decisions". In one of the offering lists he appears together with Nikkal and Yarikh.
Ninatta and Kulitta	nnt klt	Ninatta and Kulitta were the handmaidens of Šauška. Both of them are attested in Hurrian offering lists from Ugarit.
Nupatik	nbdg	Nupatik was a commonly worshiped Hurrian god, but his functions remain unclear. He most likely appears as a psychopomp in one of the Hurrian texts from Ugarit. He is also attested in offering lists and in a single theophoric name.
Pendigalli	pdgl	Pendigalli (Pentikalli) was most likely the Hurrian form of Mesopotamian Belet Ekallim (Ninegal). She is attested in Ugarit in a Hurrian theophoric name, annpdgl, possibly Annani-Pendigalli.
Pinikir	prgl (disputed)	Pinikir was an astral goddess of Elamite origin who was incorporated into the Hurrian pantheon in the west. Gary Beckman suggests that she appears in a single text from Ugarit where her name is written as prgl, but this attestation is regarded as uncertain by Piotr Taracha.
Pišaišapḫi	pḏḏpḫ	Pišaišapḫi was a god representing the mountain Pišaiša, most likely located close to the Mediterranean coast. He is attested in Hurrian offering lists from Ugarit.
Šarruma	ṯrm	Šarruma was a god who most likely originated in the kingdom of Kizzuwatna. He appears relatively commonly in Ugaritic theophoric names, with as many as twenty eight known, though three of them belonged to people from outside the city. In a single text from Ugarit he is referred to as the sukkallu (messenger or attendant deity) of Kumarbi. However, elsewhere he was chiefly associated with Hebat and Teshub.
Šauška	ṯuṯk	Šauška was a Hurrian goddess of love and war regarded as similar to Mesopotamian Ishtar. In Ugarit she was associated with Ashtart, and they appear together in the same ritual text. The goddess "Ashtart ḫr", possibly to be interpreted as "Ashtart of Hurri", might correspond to Šauška too.
Šimige	ṯmg	Šimige was the Hurrian sun god. He appears in nine theophoric names known from Ugaritic texts and in Hurrian offering lists.
Šuwala	ṯwl	Šuwala was a Hurrian goddess associated with the underworld. She is attested in a document from Ugarit alongside Nupatik and Kumarbi. She was also worshiped in nearby Emar alongside Ugur.
Teshub	tṯb	Teshub was a weather god, as well as the head of the Hurrian pantheon. He was worshiped in Ugarit both as "Teshub" (tṯb) and "Teshub of Halab" (tṯb ḫlbġ). He appears in a total of seventy theophoric names known from Ugaritic documents, though seven of them belong to people from outside the city.

== Demons ==
Name	Alphabetic writing	Details
Arsh	'arš	Arsh was a sea monster. It has been suggested that he was among the allies of Yam.
Atik	'tk	Atik was a monster addressed as the "calf of El" or perhaps "divine calf".
Ḏabību	ḏbb	Ḏabību, "spark" or "flame", was a female demonic being described as a daughter of El. She is listed in an enumeration of vanquished enemies of Anat. It has been pointed out that referring to a demon as a daughter of a major deity has a parallel in Mot's epithet "the son of El" and in the Mesopotamian tradition of referring to Lamashtu as a daughter of Anu (Akkadian: mārat Anim).
Habayu	ḥby	Habayu is a figure known from a myth about El (KTU 1.114), described in it as "lord of horns and a tail" (b'l qrnm wḏnb). He apparently smears El with excrements when the latter is intoxicated. It is generally accepted that he was a demonic being. However, Mark Smith suggested that he might be a form of Resheph, while Scott B. Noegel tries to interpret the name as an epithet of El because according to him a demon associated with inebriation would be unparalleled in the Ancient Near East. He additionally proposes the name was derived from the root ḥbb, which is considered an onomatopoeic representation of murmuring.
Illatāma Ḫāniqtāma	'iltm ḫnqtm	Illatāma Ḫāniqtāma, "the two strangling goddesses", were figures of uncertain nature possibly regarded as responsible for death in infancy. Despite their nature, they do appear in offering lists.
Ishatu	'išt	The name Ishatu means "fire". She was apparently regarded as a canine demonic being. Since she is addressed as the "dog of El" or "bitch of El", it is assumed that she represented a similar concept as the dogs of Marduk mentioned in the Mesopotamian god list An = Anum. Connections with the Eblaite deity ^{d}ì-sa-tù, the deification of fire, and with Mesopotamian demon Lamashtu, whose appearance could be described as dog-like, have also been proposed.
Lotan	ltn	Lotan was a mythical serpent associated with Yam. He was described as seven-headed. Seven-headed mythical snakes are known from Mesopotamian texts as well.
