= Gupan and Ugar =

Ugaritic messenger gods serving Baal

- Messenger gods
- Affiliation: Baal

Gupan and Ugar (Ugaritic: gpn w ‘ugr) were two Ugaritic gods who functioned as the messengers of the weather god Baal. They always appear as a pair in known texts. They are well attested in the Baal Cycle, where they carry messages from their master to other deities, such as Anat, Kothar-wa-Khasis and Mot. However, they are absent from offering lists and other texts dealing with the sphere of cult, which lead to the proposal that they were only literary characters, rather than actively worshiped deities.

== Names ==
The Ugaritic binomial theonym gpn w ‘ugr can be translated as "vine and field" or "vineyard and field", gpn being a presumed cognate of Hebrew gepen and Akkadian gapnu, while ‘ugr - a cognate of Akkadian ugaru. The latter word might be a cognate of the name of the city of Ugarit itself, though this proposal continues to be disputed. The name gpn is vocalized as either Gupan (Gupanu) or Gapn (Gapnu), while ‘ugr is consistently vocalized as Ugar.

Theonyms structured similarly to gpn w ‘ugr are common in Ugaritic texts, though their origin is not uniform: some represent two closely associated deities (for example Shahar-wa-Shalim), while other might be the main name of a deity and an epithet (for example Nikkal-wa-Ib). The modern consensus is that in this case two separate deities, Gupan and Ugar, are meant, in contrast with Qudšu-wa-Amrur or Kothar-wa-Khasis, similar double names which nonetheless refer to a single deity. Their dual number has been established based on grammatical form of the words referring to them. This interpretation has originally been proposed by Harold Louis Ginsberg in 1944. Dissenting opinions are not entirely absent from scholarship, one example being Nicolas Wyatt's argument that there are alternative explanations for word forms referring to them usually taken to be grammatically dual (for example presence of an enclitic in all of them), but interpreting them as a single god remains a minority view. Sang Youl Cho refers to it as a "misunderstanding". No attestation of either of the gods alone, without the other half of the pair, are known.

The metaphorical use of the word gepen to refer to people in the Hebrew Bible (Hosea 10:1, Psalm 80) is agreed to not be an indication that a god whose name was a cognate of Gupan's was ever worshiped by the Israelites.

== Character ==
The primary role of Gupan and Ugar was to act as the messengers of the Ugaritic weather god Baal. Messenger deities, such as this pair, as well as Qodesh-wa-Amrur and the analogous servants of Yam (left nameless in known texts) are considered the lowest ranked members of the Ugaritic pantheon by modern researchers. Manfred Krebernik proposes that the names of both Gupan and Ugar reflect the fact that their master, Baal, was believed to be responsible for vegetation in Ugaritic religion.

In the Baal Cycle, their role is described with various terms, including ġlm(m), ‘nn ilm, dll and ‘dd. The word ġlm, conventionally translated as "youth" or "lad," was commonly employed as a designation of lesser deities, ‘nn ilm means "divine clouds," dll was the name of an ordinary profession (based on possible Akkadian cognates presumed to be that of a scout, messenger or mediator), while ‘dd was a term used in similar contexts as dll, presumed to be a diplomatic term.

Since no attestations of either Gupan or Ugar are known from ritual texts, and no theophoric names unambiguously invoking them have been identified, it has been suggested that they might have only functioned as literary characters, rather than as actively worshiped deities.

== In the Baal Cycle ==
Gupan and Ugar first appear when Baal instructs them to bring a message to Anat. They are told to bow down, as required by etiquette. This indicates their position was inferior to Anat's. Once they reach their destination, the goddess is initially shocked at their sight, and assumes Baal is in danger, and explains to them that she already vanquished many of his enemies. The messengers reassure her that Baal is not facing such problems anymore, and tell her to come to Mount Saphon to meet with him. Only after reaching this location Anat learns that Baal is instead lamenting because he has no palace of his own.

Later Baal summons Gupan and Ugar again to tell them to go to the dwelling of the craftsman god Kothar-wa-Khasis, which is called both "Kaphtor" and "Memphis" in the same passage. The weather god instructs them tell him that he wants him to prepare gifts for Athirat to convince her to mediate with El on his behalf. They are also ordered to stop by in the dwelling of Qudšu-wa-Amrur on their way, though the purpose of this instruction remains unknown. It might mean that this messenger god was expected to join them as well, or that they were simply meant to inform him about the mission they were tasked with, but both interpretations remain speculative. The passage seems to describe them as bn ġlmt, usually translated as "sons of ġlmt." This word, conventionally translated as "lass," is attested as an epithet of Nikkal and other goddesses elsewhere, and might also refer to a specific deity in this passage.

Gupan and Ugar are also tasked with carrying Baal's words to Mot, a god residing in the underworld, apparently in his own city. It is presumed that Baal's aim in this section of the narrative is to demand submission to his authority from him, though interpretations according to which the scene is not presenting him as optimistic about the situation are also present in scholarship. He apparently considers his messengers vulnerable and advises them to keep a safe distance in order to avoid being devoured. It has been pointed out that this scene is an example of a motif well attested in Mesopotamian literature (for example in Nergal and Ereshkigal or Gilgamesh, Enkidu and the Netherworld): a person venturing to the underworld is told how to avoid specific dangers they might face. Additionally, the description of the threat posed by Mot closely parallels his own boast after he kills Baal.

After relaying Baal's message, Gupan and Ugar are subsequently ordered by Mot to bring his message to the weather god. As summarized by Mark Smith and Wayne Pitard, Mot invites Baal to a feast where he will be "his guest and the main course at once." This section is not considered an indication that Gupan and Ugar were also servants of Mot, and Smith and Pitard point out that it was possible for divine messengers to act at the orders of deities other than their usual masters. After their return, Baal sends them to Mot yet again.

It has been suggested that the anonymous messengers who later brought the news about Baal's death to El were also Gupan and Ugar.
