= Jo Ann Hackett =

American scholar (born 1949)

- Born: August 14, 1949 (age 76); Louisville, Kentucky, US
- Education: DePauw University (B.A., 1970); Indiana University (M.A., 1975); Harvard University (Ph.D, 1980)

Jo Ann Hackett (born August 14, 1949) is an American scholar of the Hebrew Bible (Old Testament) and of Biblical Hebrew and other ancient Northwest Semitic languages such as Phoenician, Punic, and Aramaic.

== Early life and education ==
Hackett was born in Louisville, Kentucky, and grew up in Jeffersonville, Indiana. She graduated from Jeffersonville High School in 1966. She received her Bachelor of Arts in Mathematics from DePauw University, 1970; her Master of Arts in Religious Studies from Indiana University, 1975; and her Doctor of Philosophy in Near Eastern Languages and Civilizations from Harvard University, 1980.

== Career ==
Hackett began her teaching career as an assistant professor of Religious Studies at Occidental College, Los Angeles. She taught at Indiana University Bloomington, where she received tenure in 1990. The same year, she moved to Harvard University, as Professor of the Practice of Biblical Hebrew and Northwest Semitic Epigraphy and Director of the Program in Biblical Hebrew. She remained at Harvard until 2009, when she became Professor of Biblical Studies in the Department of Middle Eastern Studies at the University of Texas at Austin. She retired from teaching in 2018, as Professor Emerita. She has also taught at Johns Hopkins University in Baltimore and at the Weston School of Theology in Cambridge, Massachusetts.

== Scholarship ==
Hackett's first book presented a philological analysis of a long ancient inscription found at the site of Deir ʕAllā in Jordan, an inscription that featured the biblical character Balaam. She also wrote several articles about the inscription, and has written extensively about related ancient Northwest Semitic dialects such as Biblical Hebrew, Phoenician, and Ugaritic, also co-editing a book on Northwest Semitic epigraphy in honor of her Doktorvater, Frank Moore Cross. She is the author of a popular textbook, A Basic Introduction to Biblical Hebrew. Hackett was also among the first scholars to write about the Hebrew Bible from a feminist perspective, with such articles as “In the Days of Jael: Reclaiming the History of Women in Ancient Israel,” "Rehabilitating Hagar: Fragments of an Epic Pattern," and "Can a Sexist Model Liberate Us?" In addition to many other articles on the Hebrew Bible, she has contributed the introduction and notes to the biblical book of Numbers in the HarperCollins Study Bible, and the introduction and notes to the books of Books of Samuel in the Women's Bible Commentary. She served for many years on the executive council of the Society of Biblical Literature, on the board of the American Schools of Oriental Research, and as an editor of the series Harvard Semitic Studies and of several academic journals.

== Honors and awards ==
In 1996–97, Hackett was the Hugh Pilkington Research Fellow in Biblical Studies at Christ Church, Oxford University. In 2002, she was a Fellow at the Israel Institute for Advanced Studies. In 2006, she received the Everett S. Mendelsohn Excellence in Mentoring Award from Harvard University. She was presented with a Festschrift in 2015, Epigraphy, Philology, and the Hebrew Bible: Methodological Perspectives on Philological and Comparative Study of the Hebrew Bible in Honor of Jo Ann Hackett included contributions from Gary A. Rendsburg and F. W. Dobbs-Allsopp. A second Festschrift, Zimrat JAH: A Tribute to Jo Ann Hackett, comprising articles by her former students, was published in 2021 as a special issue of the journal Maarav. In 2016 she was inducted into the Johns Hopkins University Society of Scholars.
