= Qudšu-wa-Amrur =

Ugaritic god or pair of gods

- Fisherman of Athirat

Qudšu-wa-Amrur (Ugaritic: qdš w amrr) was a minor Ugaritic god (or a pair of gods) regarded as the fisherman and messenger of Athirat. He is attested in a single prayer found in Ugarit, as well as in the Baal Cycle, where he appears in his traditional role as the servant of his mistress.

== Name ==
Multiple vocalizations of the Ugaritic theonym qdš w amrr can be found in modern publications: Qudšu-wa-Amrur, Qudš-wa-Amrar, Qodesh-and-Amrur, Qadesh-and-Amurr. A less common variant without the w sign is vocalized accordingly. The element qdš can be translated as "holy" or "holiness", and is also attested as an epithet of deities such as El. A connection between amrr and the Mesopotamian god Amurru has been proposed. However, this word is written differently from the toponym Amurru (amr) in Ugaritic. While it cannot be ruled out that two spellings were used to make a distinction between a pair of etymologically related words, a toponym and a theonym, there is no clear evidence in favor of this view. Furthermore, no epithet analogous to qdš was applied to Amurru in Mesopotamia.

As noted by Manfred Krebernik, whether Qudšu-wa-Amrur should be understood as one or two deities remains a subject of debate. Steve A. Wiggins considers him to be a singular god with a double name, like Kothar-wa-Khasis. This view is also supported by authors such as Mark Smith and Sang Youl Cho. Dennis Pardee instead argues that two deities were meant, and points out the occurrence of qdš alone in a single ritual text.

== Character ==
Deities such as Qudšu-wa-Amrur or the pair Gupan and Ugar occupied the lowest level in the divine hierarchy of the Ugaritic pantheon.

Qudšu-wa-Amrur was referred to as the "fisherman of Athirat" (dgy aṯrt); researchers who assume that two deities are meant accordingly translate the epithet as plural, "fishermen of Athirat". Attempts to translate dgy as the name of a hypothetical merman-like mythical being are regarded as implausible. Qudšu-wa-Amrur's role might be related to this goddess' own connection to the sea, exemplified by the phrase "Lady Athirat of the Sea" (rbt aṯrt ym), which occurs twenty one times in known Ugaritic texts, which makes it one of the four best attested epithets in the entire text corpus. Aicha Rahmouni points out that the designation of minor deities as fishermen of other members of the pantheon finds a parallel in Mesopotamian texts, such as the god list An = Anum, and notes that the analogous Mesopotamian divine fishermen were apparently believed to provide the temples of deities they served with fish. Qudšu-wa-Amrur was also believed to act as Athirat's messenger. Little is known about the character of the relation between these deities otherwise.

== Attestations ==
Qudšu-wa-Amrur is attested in only one ritual text from Ugarit, a prayer for well-being invoking a large number of deities (RS 24.271). The same text also mentions a deity named qdš, according to Dennis Pardee to be understood as the first half of the same binomial name. He considers a link with the Egyptian goddess Qetesh to be implausible due to the Ugaritic qdš most likely being a masculine deity, unlike her. There is also no clear evidence for qdš referring to Athirat.

In the Baal Cycle, Qudšu-wa-Amrur is first mentioned when Baal sends Gupan and Ugar to carry his request to prepare gifts for Athirat to Kothar-wa-Khasis, though contrary to early assumptions it is now agreed that he is not directly involved, and the messengers are merely told to pass close to his dwelling on their way to the abode of the craftsman god. It is not known why the two messengers need to visit him, and the presently known fragments of the text make it impossible to determine if he is only informed about their mission, or if he also joins them.

Later, when Baal and Anat approach Athirat, Qudšu-wa-Amrur apparently accompanies his mistress. He helps her get ready for the journey to El's house. He is specifically responsible for preparing the animal on whose back she travels, though due to ambiguity of the Ugaritic terms used and their Akkadian cognates it is not certain if a horse, donkey or onager is meant. He subsequently leads her traveling party. A brief description which follows depending on interpretation might either portray him as a luminous deity who shines like a star, or instead only indicate that he held a torch in his hand.
