= Puġat =

Ugaritic mythological figure

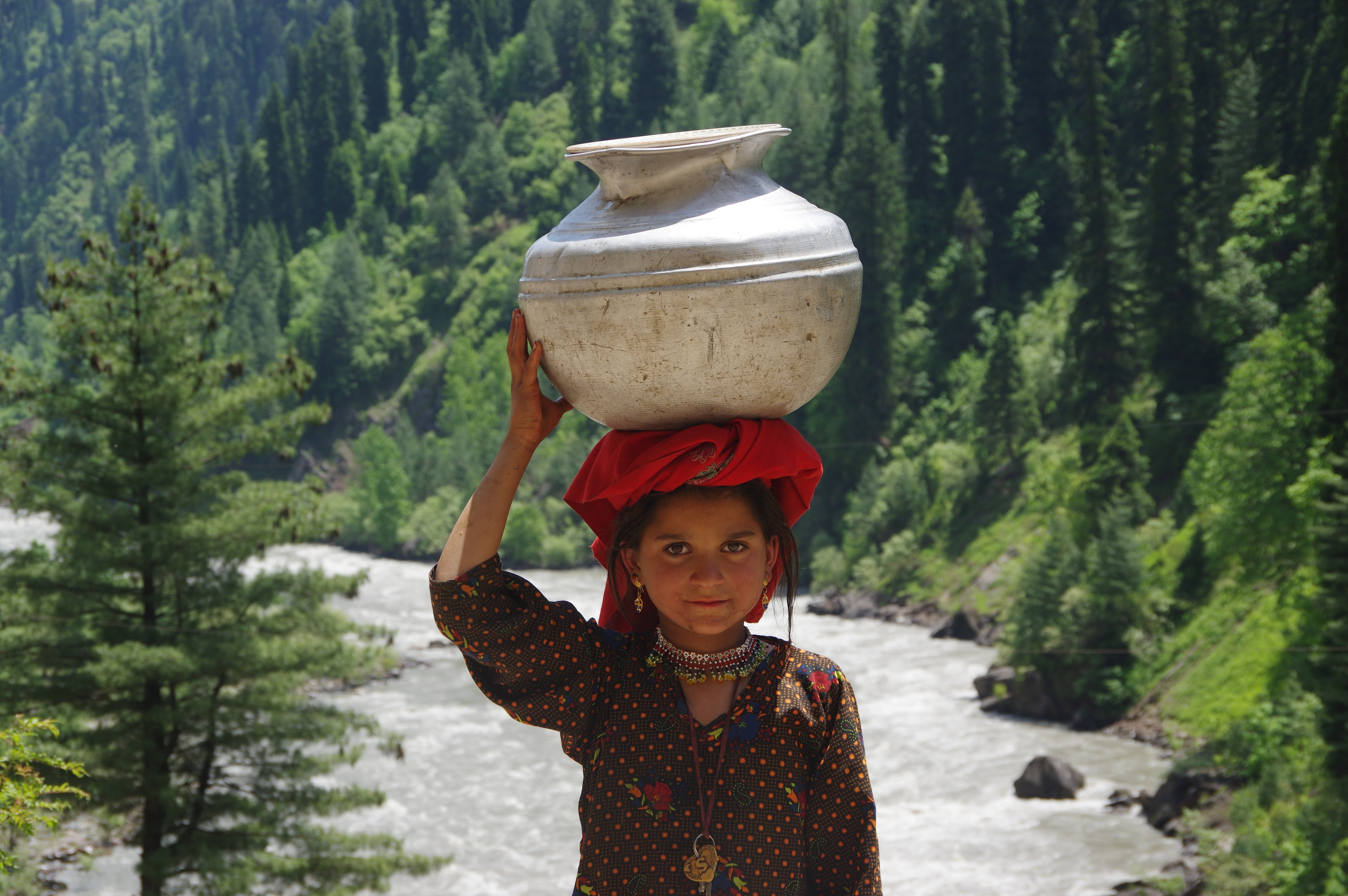
Puġat was called "she who carries water."

Puġat or Pughat (Ugaritic: 𐎔𐎙𐎚, romanized: pġt, Virolleaud, e.g. 2:15: connection to the woman's personal name Puʿah) is a character in the Ugaritic poem of the Tale of Aqhat in Canaanite religion. Her name is the common noun for 'girl' and she and Aqhat are the children of Danel. She is described as follows: "She who carries water / she who collects dew on her hair / she who knows the course of the stars."

Her main function is said to be "the cultivation of the wheat and vine." She avenges her brother Aqhat's death, following the Mesopotamian trope of Anat.

== Personality and ideals ==
Puġat is virtuous. She is depicted as the antithesis of Anat, requiring a head-to-foot disguise to align her actions and appearance with Anat's. Unlike Anat, who is portrayed as capable of homicide for base reasons, Puġat is presented as someone unable to commit such an act, even for noble causes. This dichotomy accentuates the poet's belief in the intrinsic value and superior intelligence and courage of women, traits that are underappreciated in Raphaite society. Unlike the honorific yet unrelated epithets bestowed upon her male counterparts, Puġat's simple name and straightforward descriptors resonate with her genuine qualities—industriousness, ingenuity, and humility.

Puġat is characterized as a 'wise-woman,' but her wisdom diverges from the 'book learning' accessible to her more privileged 'kid brother.' Her knowledge stems from her close interaction with nature; her understanding of the stars arises from her early rising, while her familiarity with the fauna and flora is attributed to her labor in the fields. This hands-on knowledge equips her to perceive ominous signs of impending trouble, providing her with insight that eludes her educated father.

Puġat goes on a mission to avenge her brother's blood in the tent-camp of the Sutean Ytpn. However, her bravery extends beyond singular acts of valor. Puġat's courage is seen as a reflection of her inner strength, a Canaanite ideal. It is her mastery over her emotions that underscores her true strength, showcasing a form of resilience and determination that transcends the conventional heroic attributes explored in the poem.
