= Shiphrah and Puah =

Midwives who appear in the Book of Exodus

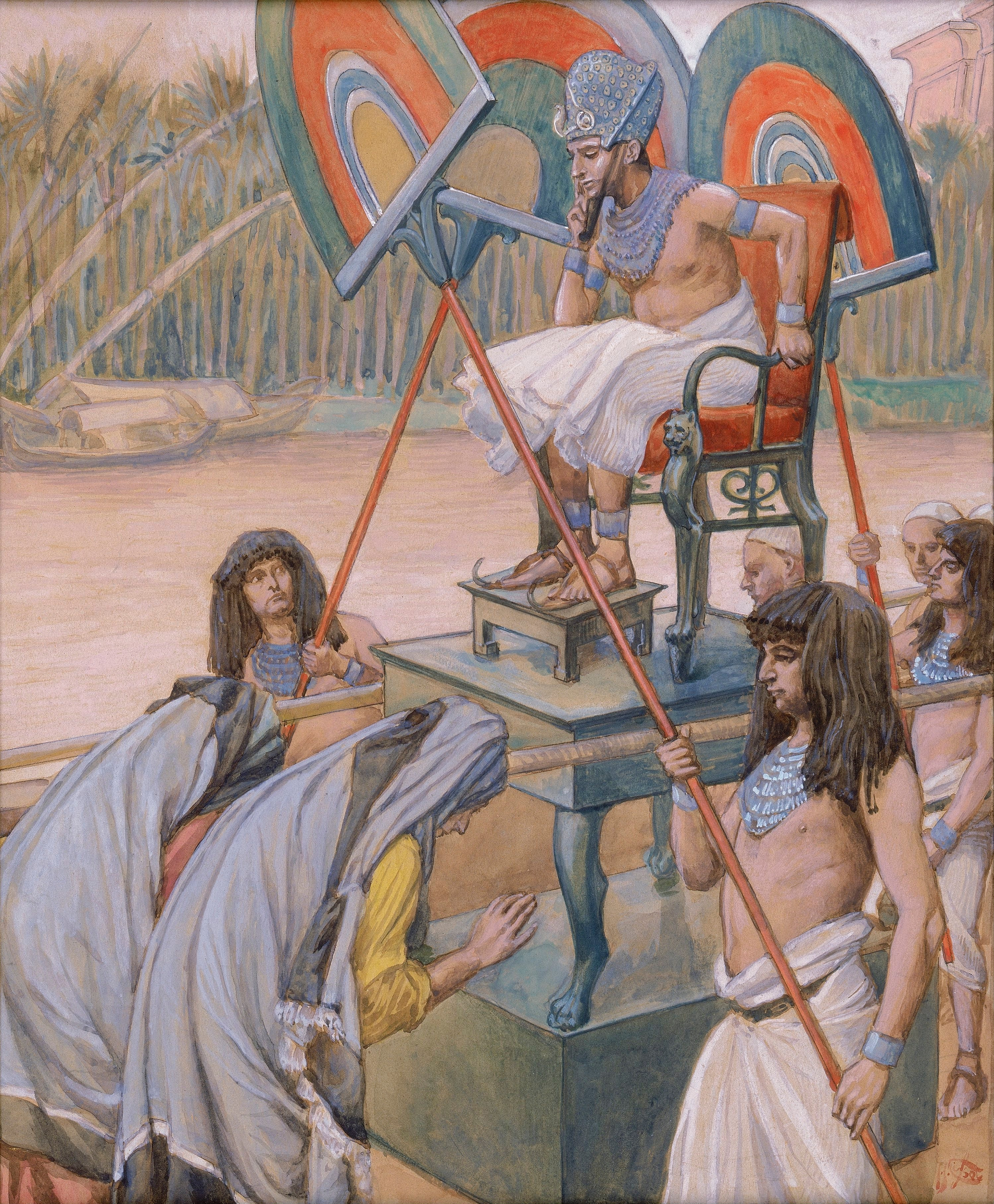
Pharaoh and the Midwives, James Tissot c. 1900

Shiphrah (Hebrew: שִׁפְרָה Šip̄rā) and Puah (Hebrew: פּוּעָה Pūʿā) were two midwives who briefly prevented a genocide of children by the Egyptians, according to Exodus 1:15–21. According to the Exodus narrative, they were commanded by Pharaoh to kill all male Hebrew babies, but refused to do so. When challenged by Pharaoh, they told him Hebrew women's labour was short-lived and the babies had been born (and protected) before the midwives arrived. God "dealt well with the midwives" and "made them houses".

== Exodus 1:15–1:21 ==
15 The king of Egypt spoke to the Hebrew midwives, one of whom was named Shiphrah and the other Puah, saying, 16 “When you deliver the Hebrew women, look at the birthstool: if it is a boy, kill him; if it is a girl, let her live.” 17 The midwives, fearing God, did not do as the king of Egypt had told them; they let the boys live. 18 So the king of Egypt summoned the midwives and said to them, “Why have you done this thing, letting the boys live?” 19 The midwives said to Pharaoh, “Because the Hebrew women are not like the Egyptian women: they are vigorous. Before the midwife can come to them, they have given birth.” 20 And God dealt well with the midwives; and the people multiplied and increased greatly. 21 And [God] established households for the midwives, because they feared God.

== Interpretations ==
The Babylonian Talmud, tractate Sotah 11b, identifies Shiphrah with Jochebed, the mother of Moses, and Puah with Miriam, Moses' sister, making the two midwives mother and daughter, respectively. See, for example, Judah Loew ben Bezalel's Gur Aryeh: Sifrei Chachamim.

=== "The midwives feared God" ===
The Torah has no word for religion. The closest related concept found in the Torah is what it calls "the fear of God" in Exodus 1:17. The midwives apparently believed that God's moral demands outweighed Pharaoh's legal demands. For this reason, author Francine Klagsbrun said that the midwives' refusal to follow the Pharaoh's genocidal instructions "may be the first known incident of civil disobedience in history." Theologian Jonathan Magonet agrees, calling them "the earliest, and in some ways the most powerful, examples, of resistance to an evil regime".

The "fear of God" theme is reversed a few verses later when Pharaoh commands the Egyptian people to carry out the genocide (Exod. 1:22). The Egyptians apparently feared Pharaoh more than they feared God, and therefore, participated in the crime. Joseph Telushkin compared Shiphrah and Puah's defection with the rescuers of Jews during the Holocaust, many of whom had been religious. Those who aided the Nazis, on the other hand, feared the Nazis' power more than they feared (or even believed in) God's judgment.

=== "Made houses" ===
Commentators have interpreted Exodus 1:20–21 in various ways. Some scholars argue that the two halves of each verse are parallel, so that it is the Israelites ('who multiplied and grew greatly') for whom God 'made houses'. This aligns with the reference in Exodus 1:1 to the children of Israel coming down to Egypt, each with their own "house". However, Jonathan Magonet notes that the more common view is that the houses are for the midwives - "houses" here being understood as 'dynasties'. Rabbinic thought has understood these as the houses of kehuna (priesthood), leviya (assistants to the priests), and royalty – the latter interpreted as coming from Miriam. See also Exodus Rabba 1:17.

== Names ==
The names of Shiphrah and Puah are typical Semitic names. The name Šp-ra is found in a list of slaves in Egypt during the reign of Sobekhotep III (around 1745 BCE). This list is on Papyrus Brooklyn 35.1446, in the Brooklyn Museum. The museum states that "Scholars assume that this is a hieroglyphic transliteration of the Hebrew name Shiphra." The name means "to be fair" or "beautiful", and may be related to, or even the same as, the Aramaic Šappira and Shiphrah, the name of the Hebrew midwife. The name of the second midwife, Puʿah, is a Canaanite name which means "young woman" or "little girl". An earlier form of this name, Puġat, appears in the Tale of Aqhat from Ugarit, where the character of Puġat is a heroic figure.
