= Rephaim text =

Ugaritic text about the Rephaim

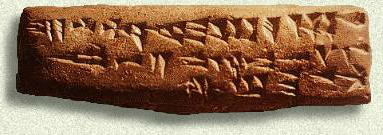
An Abecedarium tablet from Ugarit

The Rephaim text is an ancient Ugaritic poem consisting of three fragmentary tablets discovered in Ras Shamra and dating to the 14th century BCE. The text describes the Rephaim, a group of warrior-like figures, undertaking a three-day chariot journey to a threshing floor where they partake in a seven-day feast. Scholars debate the identity of the Rephaim, with interpretations ranging from deified ancestors, minor deities, and underworld spirits to human cultic figures associated with fertility rites. The text is linked to the Tale of Aqhat, possibly as a prequel, and shares thematic elements with El’s Drinking Party. Though the precise meaning of the text remains uncertain, it emphasizes feasting, divine participation, and family lineage, suggesting the Rephaim were semi-divine or royal figures with connections to the gods.

== Background ==
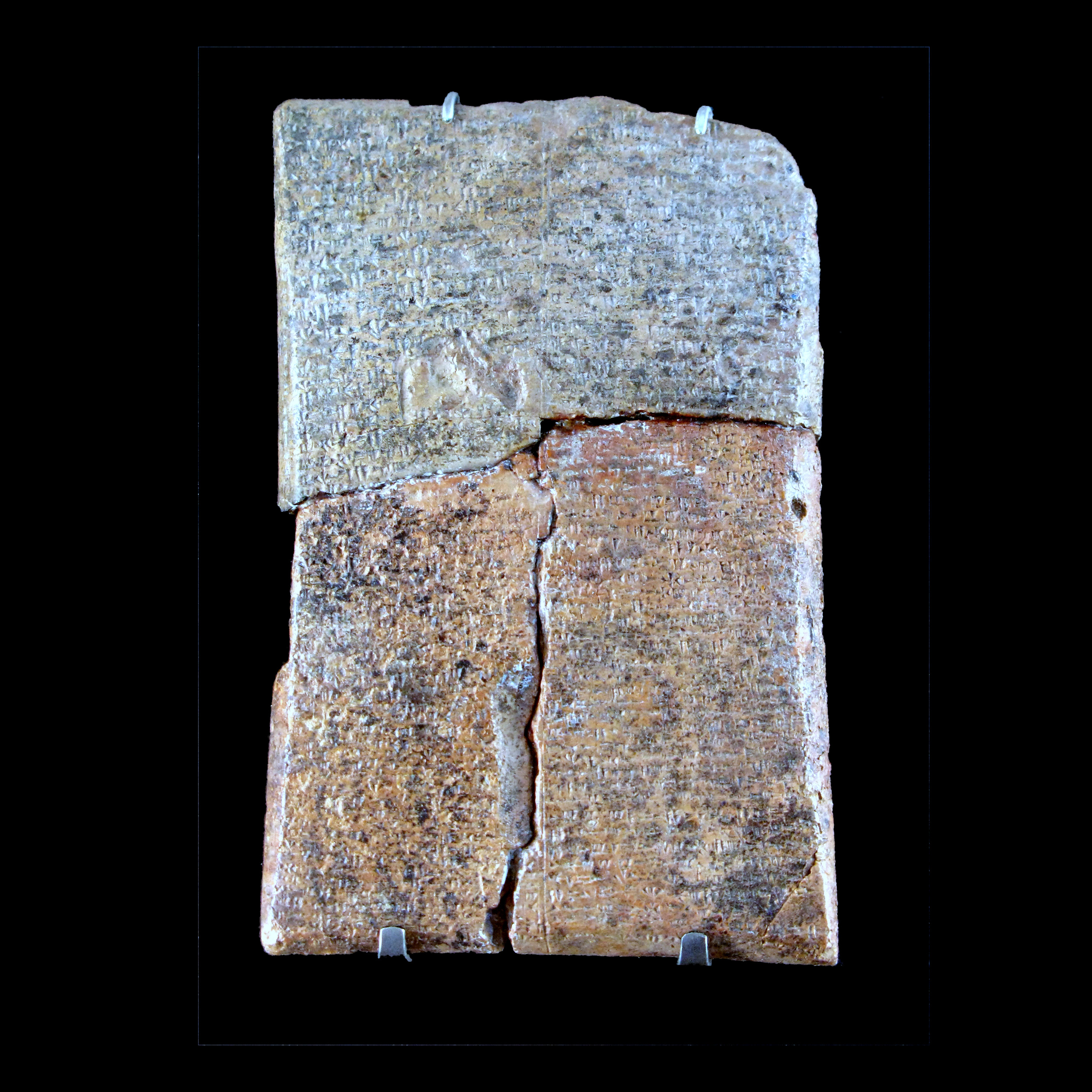
Tablet of the legend of Danel and his son Aqhat, or the Tale of Aqhat, in Ugaritic

The Rephaim Text is an ancient Ugaritic poem, the first tablet of which was published by Charles Virolleaud in 1936 together with the tale of Aqhat, and was published again by Virolleaud with the remaining two tablets in 1941. According to some scholars, the mention of Danel, the father of Aqhat, leads to the view that this work is a sequel to the tale of Aqhat. However, Jonathan Yogev has argued that this is highly speculative, and that these texts depict a younger version of Danel, suggesting they precede the Aqhat story. Another suggestion is based on the fact that it shares the theme of the Marzeah with El's Drinking Party and therefore should be seen as connected to it. The text consists of three fragmentary tablets, the content of which is rather obscure.

The existing portion of the work describes an invitation of the Rephaim to someone's house, their three day chariot journey and arrival at the "threshing floor", and a seven day long feast during which the Rephaim revel in eating and drinking.

== The identity of the Rephaim ==
Conrad L'Heureux has identified three main approaches to the identity of the Rephaim. According to Virroleaud and R. Dussaud, the Rephaim are minor deities who accompany Ba'al and follow him down into the underworld, as such Virroleaud suggested that the meaning of the term eventually evolved to be "shades of the dead" in Biblical Hebrew and Phoenician. According to André Caquot the meaning of the term is "shades", as in Phoenician and Biblical Hebrew, and Marvin Pope suggested the similar meaning of "deified dead", supported by the fact that deifying the deceased was common practice in the time and place of the composition.

John Gray proposed that the Rephaim were actually human "cultic functionaries" who join the king on his visits to threshing floors and plantations, as is described in the Rephaim text, "in order to promote fertility". L'Heureux proposed a fourth opinion that the Rephaim were gods, though not minor ones. According to his conclusion the term Rephaim may refer either to human or divine individuals or groups. When in the divine context, the singular will refer to the god El and the plural to all those gods who gather at his invitation, in the human context it refers to an "aristocratic warrior guild under the patronage of El".

Similar to Pope, Coogan and Smith suggest that the Rephaim refer to deified deceased ancestors, proposing that they were called "Healthy Ones" due to the state of well-being they were believed to attain after death. In Ugaritic texts, the Rephaim were worshipped in the form of feasts and fruit harvests so that they would grant their blessings of human and agricultural fertility. Based on references to kinship between the gods and the Rephaim in the texts, Jonathan Yogev suggests that the Rephaim were the mortal descendants of the divine family, and acted as demigod kings or leaders who served the gods.

== Content ==
Though direct evidence for the relationship between the three tablets is absent, they are most probably linked due to repeated literary formulas and the mention of the Rephaim as main characters in all three. There is disagreement among scholars whether the tablets belong to the same narrative but were inscribed by different hands, are the existing portions of three tablets of a larger mythic narrative, or all belong to a large tablet consisting of six columns. Epigraphic analyses have concluded that tables 2 and 3 were inscribed by the same hand, while tablet 1 was by another, however most studies attribute all three tablets to ʾIlimilku, a famous scribe of the 14th century who was responsible for many other Ugaritic texts, including the Baal Cycle and the story of Aqhat. Although missing data from the tablets deem all attempts to reconstruct the text speculative, many have attempted to form a cohesive story from the text in various ways. The following material description is based on the text presentation in The Rephaim, by Yogev, and the content description is based on that which appears in Stories from ancient Canaan, by Coogan and Smith.

=== Tablet 1 ===
(KTU 1.20/ RS 3.348 / Vir I Rp / UT 121 / CTA 20)

The first tablet of the text was also the last to be found, near the House of the High Priest in Ras Shamra in 1931, and it is currently located in the Louvre. Its height is 4.8 cm and its width is 8.3 cm. Based on the presence of a dividing line between the columns, scholars conclude that the tablet originally consisted of 4 or 6 columns. Only one face of the tablet has any legible text, and it is unknown whether it is the obverse or reverse side of the tablet, for that reason it is unclear in which order the columns should be read. Of the left column only 11 partial lines survived, while the right column has 12 lines.

The first tablet describes the Rephaim preparing for their journey, mounting their chariots and hitching their horses, as well as the three day journey itself. It concludes with their arrival at the threshing floor, after the sunset of the third day, and Danel's invitation to eat.

=== Tablet 2 ===
(KTU 1.21 / RS 2.[019] / Vir II Rp / UT 122 / CTA 21)

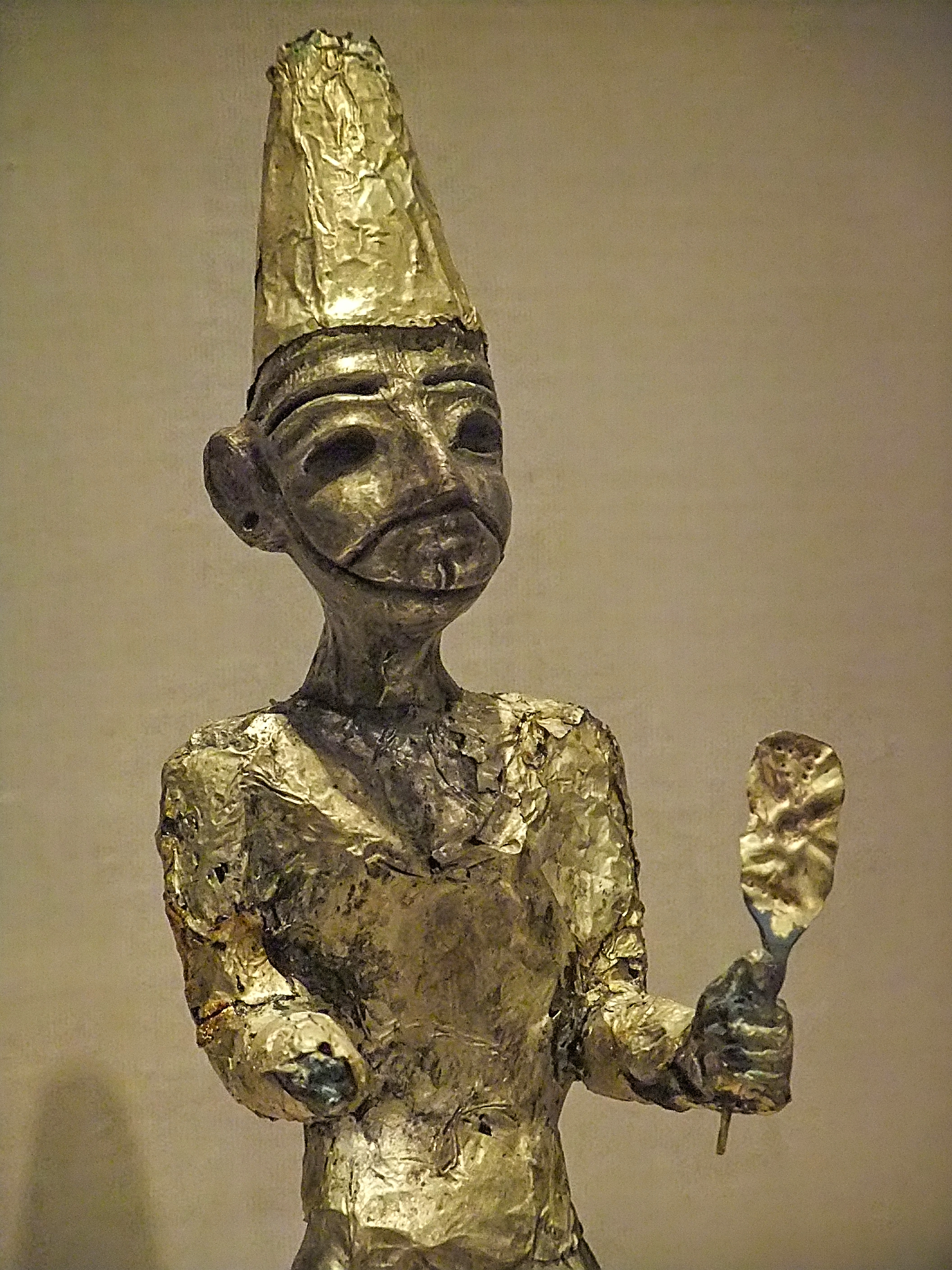
A figurine of the god El

The second tablet, with a height of 3.6 cm and a width of 4.3 cm, probably had 4-6 columns. Unlike the first tablet, it was found inside the House of the High Priest in Ras Shamra in 1930, and is currently located in the National Museum of Aleppo. On one side a partial column exists and contains 13 fragmentary lines, while on the other side only a few characters can be read. Like the first tablet, it is unclear which side was the obverse and which the reverse.

The second tablet is very fragmentary, though it too describes an invitation of the Rephaim to a feast. In line 8, the speaker is identified as El, which may refer to the god El, or is being used as a general term for god. The only legible words on the back of the tablet are "to the earth".

=== Tablet 3 ===
(KTU 1.22 / RS 2.[024] / Vir III Rp / UT 124 / CTA 21)

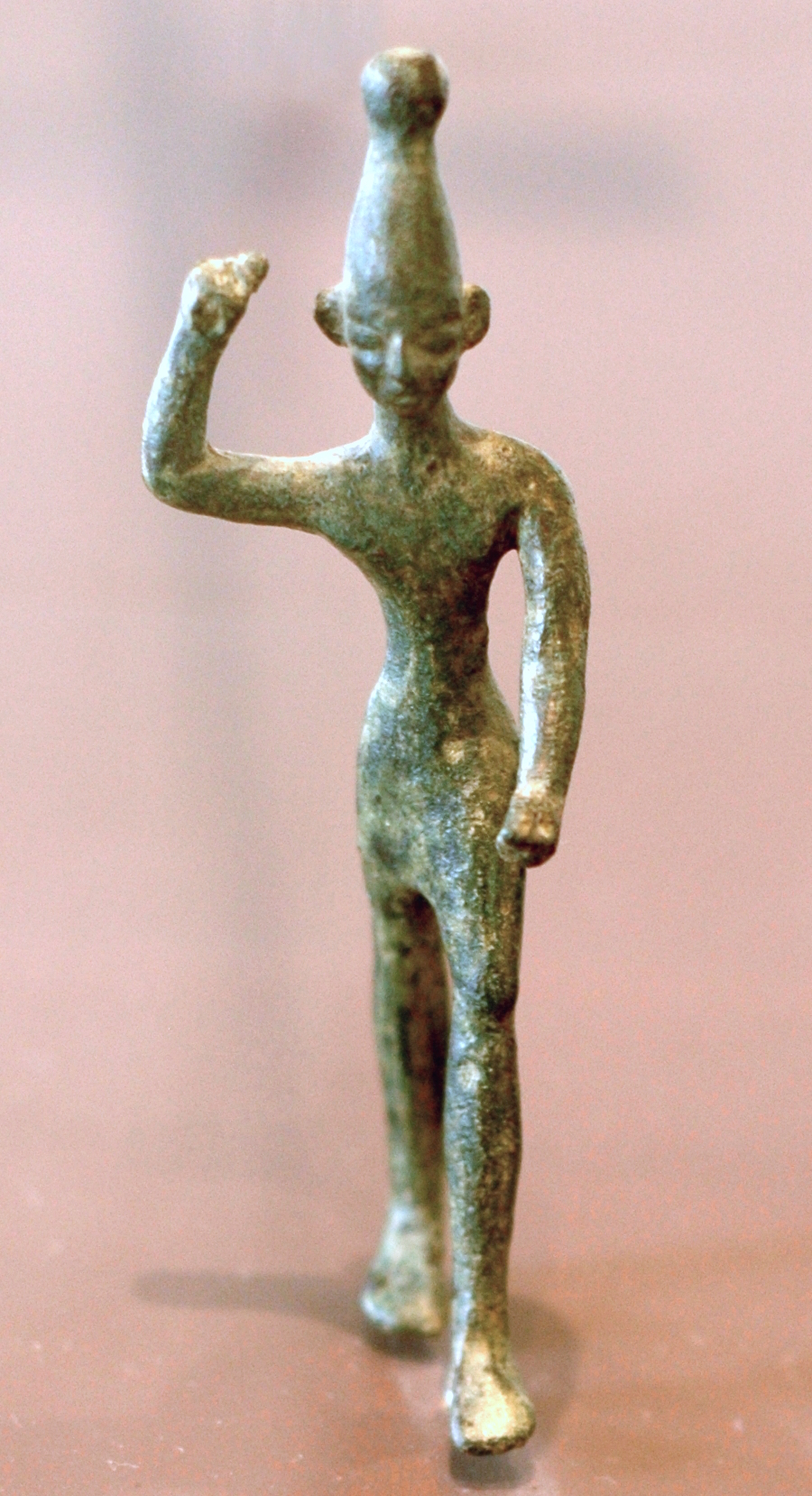
A figurine of the god Baal from Ugarit

The third tablet, with a height of 8.4 cm and a width of 8.4 cm, was found together with the second, in the House of the High Priest in Ras Shamra during the 1930 excavations, and is also currently located in the National Museum of Aleppo. It too is relatively fragmentary. Lines 5-11 of the left column describe the arrival of the Rephaim, who are mentioned as "the warriors of Baal and Anat", to the house or palace of the speaker, who calls them to a feast. The rest of the left column includes a description of the ascension of a figure to his throne and his invitation of the Rephaim to his palace, as well as the journey of the Rephaim there.

The right column, with twenty six lines, is the most complete of any in the three tablets. In it is mention of the royal princes, circled by the Rephaim, as well as a slaughter of cattle and sheep which is compared to the hunt of Anat when she "shoots the birds of heaven". Lines 14-20 mention a table laden with the products of the late summer harvest, namely fruit and wine. Lines 20-26 describe the seven day feast of the Rephaim "on the height... in the heart of Lebanon", and conclude with mention of "Baal the conqueror" on the seventh day. The rest of the narrative was broken off, so that the description of Baal, his words and his actions are missing.

== General conclusions ==
Although the exact purpose, meaning, and context of this myth is still unknown, Jonathan Yogev has collected a number of conclusions which can be derived from its fragmentary remains.

- The Rephaim of the myth are a group of seven or eight important individuals, one of whom is Danel.
- It is unclear who the host of the feast is, possibly one of the Rephaim or a god, though Yogev suggests that it is El, based on appearances in other myths.
- Special focus is given to the feast, and details are given about the types of butchered animals, wine and other dishes that were served, suggesting some form of celebration, possibly of one event or several.
- The text makes use of a textual formula known from the Ba'al Cycle and related to Ba'als coronation, suggesting that the Rephaim Text also refers to a coronation of a well loved individual, identified by Yogev as either Yḥpn or Ṯmq, the latter being one of the Rephaim.
- The gods play an important role in the myth, with Baal, Anat and El being mentioned more than once, though it is unclear whether or where the gods are the guests and the Rephaim the hosts or vice versa.
- The myth places strong emphasis on family connections, frequently mentioning sons and grandsons in relation to the gods. Drawing from these references, Yogev proposes that the Rephaim were mortal members of the divine lineage—not deities themselves, but rather demigod kings or leaders who served the gods.
- The Rephaim are battle-chariot-riding warriors.
- Danel in the Rephaim texts is the younger version of the same character in the tale of Aqhat.

== Notable editions ==
- Virolleaud Charles. Les rephaïm. Fragments de poèmes de Ras Shamra. In: Syria. Volume 22 Issue 1, 1941. pp. 1–30.
- Herdner, Andrée. Corpus des Tablettes en Cuneiformes Alphabetiques: Decouvertes a Ras Shamra-Ugarit de 1929 a 1939. Mission de Ras Shamra. Vol 10 (Paris: P. Geuthner, 1963). pp. 92–96. Photographs appear in Vol II: fig. 63 pl. XXXI; fig. 64, pl. XXXI; fig. 65–66, pl. XXXI.
- Gordon, Cyrus H. Ugaritic Textbook: Grammar, Texts in Transliteration, Cuneiform Selections, Glossary, Indice. AnOr 38 (Rome: Pontificium Institutum Biblicum, 1965), pp. 191–192.
- Pitard, Wayne T. A New Edition of the “Rāpiʾūma,” Texts: KTU 1.20–22. BASOR 285 (1992), pp. 33–77.
- Pardee, Dennis G. Nouvelle étude épigraphique et littéraire des textes fragmentaires en langue ougaritique dits «Les Rephaïm» (CTA 20–22). Orientalia 80 (2011), pp. 1–65.
- Coogan, Michael David; Smith, Mark S. eds. (2012). Stories from ancient Canaan (2nd ed.). Louisville, KY: Westminster John Knox Press. pp. 57–63.
- Dietrich, Manfried. Loretz, Oswald. and Sanmartín, Joaquín. The Cuneiform Alphabetic Texts from Ugarit, Ras ibn Hani and Other Places. AOAT 360/1 (Münster, Ugarit-Verlag, 2013), pp. 62–67.
- Yogev, Jonathan. The Rephaim. Leiden, The Netherlands: Brill. (2021). pp. 7–38.

== See also ==
- Danel
- Tale of Aqhat
- Ugaritic texts
- Marzēaḥ
- Rephaite
