= Rephaite =

Group mentioned in the Hebrew Bible

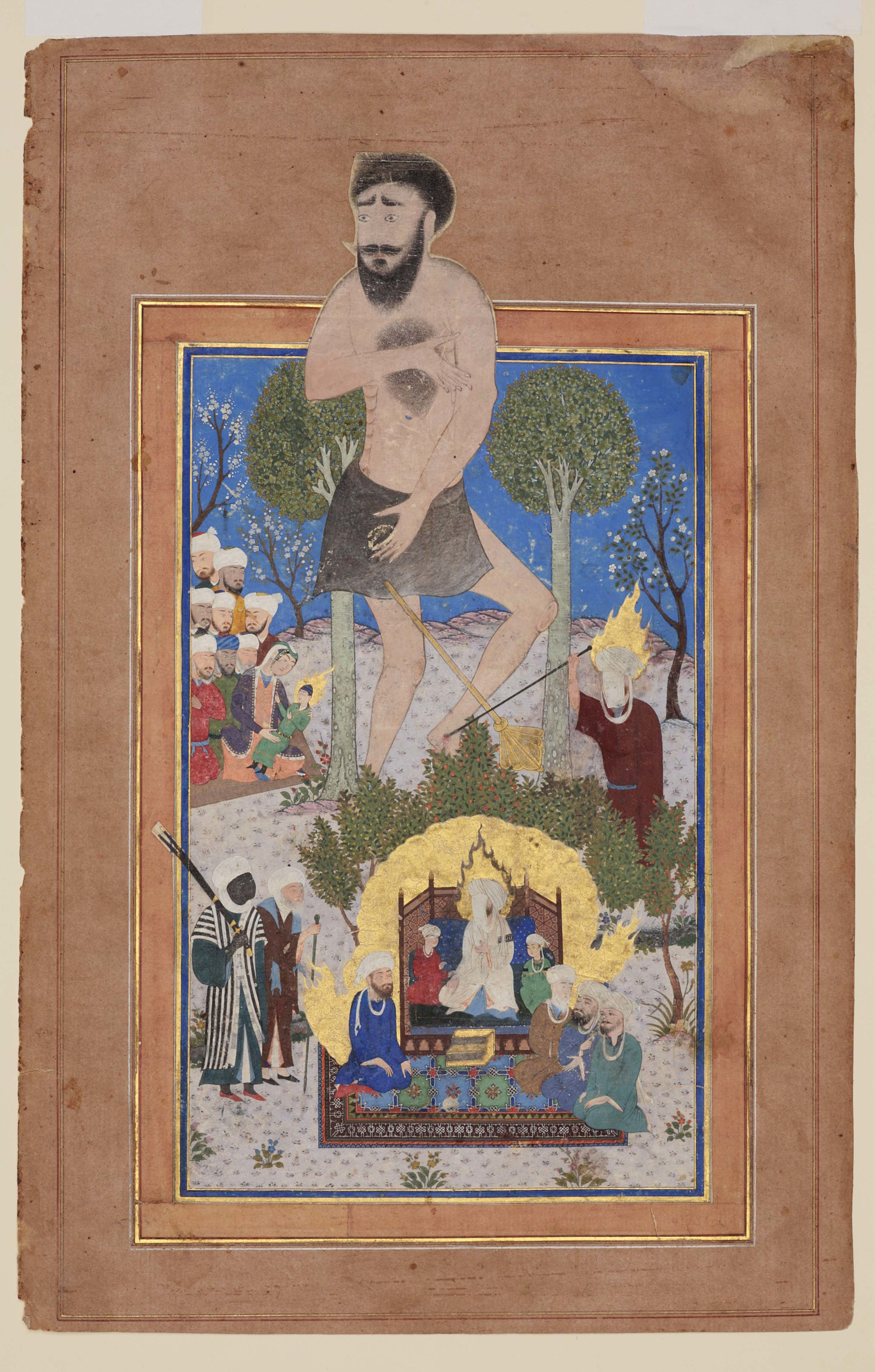
Musa va 'Uj, a 15th-century manuscript painting from Iran or Iraq, depicting the Rephaite Og.

In the Hebrew Bible, as well as non-Jewish ancient texts from the region, the Northwest Semitic term Rephaite (from Repha'im, Biblical Hebrew: רְפָאִים, romanized: rəp̄āʾīm; Ugaritic: 𐎗𐎔𐎜𐎎, romanized: rapiʾūma; Phoenician: 𐤓𐤐𐤀𐤌, romanized: rpʾm), refers to a people of greater-than-average height and stature in Deuteronomy 3:10-11, or departed spirits in the afterlife, Sheol as written in the following scriptures: Isaiah 26:14; Psalms 88:11, and Proverbs 9:18.

== Etymology ==
The term Rephaim first appears in Ugarit.

There is no consensus regarding the exact vocalization of the name “Rpʾum” in Ugaritic, since the word does not appear in syllabic texts. The first syllable, /ra/, is mostly based on Semitic names from Ugarit, Canaan, Mari and other places written in syllabic text that carry the element Rpʾ. Examples: Ra-pí-ú-um; A-bi-ra-pí; Ya-ku-un-ra-pí; Am-mu-ra-pí; Ra-pa-Ya-ma; Ra-pí-DINGIR and more. It is not certain, however, if the element Rpʾ in these names refers solely to the Rephaim[.] For the nominative case, several readings have been suggested in various studies, such as Rapa‌ʾūma, Rāpa‌ʾūma, Rāpiʾūma, Rapiʾūma and so on.

There are two main groups of etymological hypotheses regarding the origin of the biblical term "Rephaim". The first group proposes it is a native Hebrew language term, which could be derived from the Semitic root רָפָא r-p-ʾ or רָפָה r-ph. The first root suggests "healing" (רְפוּאָה, rəp̄ūʾā) of some sort, as in the purgation souls—at least the souls of those who in life were incompletely righteous—undergo in Gehinnom (גֵיהִנֹּם, /ɡəˈhɪnəm/) between death and the world to come to atone for their earthly sins. The second root denotes weakness or powerlessness. Souls in Sheol (שְׁאוֹל, Shəʾōl) are weak in the sense that they hold no physical power or status as they did in the living world. Because all things that give the living power are moot in Sheol, its inhabitants are thus powerless and weak and must be submissive to God.

The second group of etymological hypotheses treats Rephaim as a loanword from other ancient Semitic languages. Among the proposals is the Akkadian rabu ("prince"), but this explanation enjoys rather limited popularity. Far more support has been gained by the hypothesis that derives the Hebrew Rephaim from the Ugaritic rpum, which denotes semi-deified deceased ancestors mentioned in sources like the so-called Rephaim text (KTU 1:20–22). Despite the inconsistency between these possible meanings—and that modern translations clearly distinguish between Rephaites as one of the tribes (e.g., Genesis 14:5, Genesis 15:18–21, and Deuteronomy 2:11–20) and Rephaim as the inhabitants of the underworld (e.g., Isaiah 14:9–11 and Isaiah 26:13–15)—the same word is used in the original text.

== Canaanite people group ==
In the Hebrew Bible, "Rephaites" or "Repha'im" describes an ancient race of giants in Canaan, from the Bronze Age to the Iron Age. Many locations were also named after them. According to Genesis 14:5, King Chedorlaomer and his allies attacked and defeated the Rephaites at Ashteroth Karnaim. Rephaites are also mentioned at Genesis 15:20; Deuteronomy 2:10–21, 3:11; the Book of Joshua (Joshua 12:4, 13:12, 15:8, 17:15, 18:16); the Books of Samuel (2 Samuel 5:18–22, 23:13); and the Books of Chronicles (1 Chronicles 11:15, 14:9 and 20:4).

Medieval Jewish exegetes like Nachmanides and David Qimḥi have suggested that the Rephaim and Hivites are the same. This used to explain why the two names never appear together in Biblical lists of Canaanite tribes. Nonetheless, later scholars have called this assumption into question. Others have argued that the Rephaim were not Canaanites, but that their land was still nonetheless promised to Abraham.

In the biblical narrative, the Israelites were instructed to exterminate the previous inhabitants of the Promised Land, i.e. Canaan, which include various named peoples, including some unusually tall/large individuals. Several passages in the Book of Joshua, and also Deuteronomy 3:11, suggest that Og, king of Bashan, was one of the last survivors of the Rephaim, and that his bed was nine cubits long. (An ordinary cubit is the length of a man's forearm according to the New American Standard Bible, or approximately 18 in (460 mm). This makes the bed over 13 feet long.) Anak, according to Deuteronomy 2:11, was also a Rephaite.

The Rephaites were called the "Emim" by the Moabites in Deuteronomy 2:11, whilst the Ammonites called them the "Zamzummim" in Deuteronomy 2:18–21.

== Long dead ancestors ==
Repha'im have also been considered the residents of the Netherworld (Sheol in the Hebrew Bible) in more recent scholarship. Possible examples of this usage appear as "shades", "spirits", or "dead" in various translations of the Bible. See: Isa 14:9, 26:14, 26:19; Ps 88:10; Prov 2:18, 9:18, 21:16; Job 26:5, and possibly 2 Chron 16:12, where Repha'im may be read as "dead ancestors" or "weakeners", as opposed to Rophe'im, "doctors". The Heb. root רפא means "heal", and thus the masculine plural nominalized form of this root may indicate that these "deceased ancestors" could be invoked for ritual purposes that would benefit the living.

Various ancient Northwest Semitic texts are also replete with references to terms evidently cognate with Rephaim as the dead or dead kings. Lewis (1989) undertakes a detailed study of several enigmatic funerary ritual texts from the ancient coastal city of Ugarit. Lewis concludes that the "Ugaritic Funerary Text" provides important evidence for understanding Ugarit's cult of the dead, wherein beings called rapi'uma, the long dead, and malakuma, recently dead kings, were invoked in a funeral liturgy, presented with food/drink offerings, and asked to provide blessings for the reign of the current king. The many references to repha'im in the Hebrew Bible in contexts involving Sheol and dead spirits strongly suggests that many ancient Israelites imagined the spirits of the dead as playing an active and important role in securing blessings, healing, or other benefits in the lives of the living. In 2021, a new theory regarding the identity of the Rephaim was published by J. Yogev, which suggests that the Rephaim were systematically eradicated from biblical texts as an agenda to eliminate their memory according to monotheistic belief systems in biblical times.

The divine status of the Rephaim is evident from "The Rephaim," where they are called "gods" and "divine ones," but also from the end of "Baal" in Stories from Ancient Canaan:

Sun rules the Rephaim, Sun rules the divine ones: Your company are the gods, see, the dead are your company.

== See also ==
- Emek Refaim
- Nephilim
- Rujm el-Hiri, also called "Gilgal Refaim"
- The Book of Giants
- The Rephaim text
- Valley of Rephaim

== Literature ==
- L'Heureux, Conrad (1974). "The Ugaritic and Biblical Rephaim". The Harvard Theological Review. 67 (3): 265–274.
- Talmon, Shemaryahu (1983). "Biblical "repa'im" and Ugaritic "rpu/i(m)"". Hebrew Annual Review (7): 235–249.
- Doak, Brian R. (2011). The Last of the Rephaim: Conquest and Cataclysm in the Heroic Ages of Ancient Israel (dissertation).
- Yogev, Jonathan (2021). The Rephaim: Sons of the Gods. BRILL.
- Duke, Rodney K. (2025). "Tracking the Rephaim Through Place and Time". Religions. 16 (6).
