= Jonathan Magonet =

British rabbi theologian (born 1942)

- Born: 2 August 1942 (age 84); London, England
- Occupations: Rabbi, theologian
- Theological work
- Language: English
- Tradition or movement: Reform Judaism
- Main interests: Interfaith dialogues between Christianity, Judaism and Islam

Jonathan David Magonet (born 2 August 1942) is a British rabbi theologian, Vice-President of the World Union for Progressive Judaism, and a biblical scholar. He is highly active in Christian-Jewish dialogue, and in dialogue between Jews and Muslims. He was the long-time Principal (Rector or academic director), now retired, of London's Leo Baeck College, the first Liberal Jewish seminary of all of Europe since World War II. He resides in London with his wife Dorothea.

Magonet served on the rabbinic staff at West London Synagogue of British Jews. He has been part of the team constructing the new edition of the British Reform Prayer Book.

== Career ==
Magonet was a trustee of the Maimonides Foundation, a charitable organisation promoting dialogue between Jews and Muslims.

His 1992 book, Bible Lives, presented a series of pen portraits of figures from the Hebrew Bible, both major and (particularly) minor. Originally written for The Jewish Chronicle, they aimed to show that the Bible could still be a 'living' source of deep insight into human character. Magonet has described in the book's introduction the challenge of bringing to 'centre stage' characters like Shiphrah, Puah, Palti ben Laish and Ritzpah with only minimal information about them available from the text, and expressed the hope that readers would themselves go back to the texts to check out or challenge his interpretations.

== Books ==
- A Rabbi Reads the Torah (2013) ISBN 978-0334049135
- Talking to the Other: Jewish Interfaith Dialogue with Christians and Muslims (2003) ISBN 978-1860649059
- A Rabbi reads the Psalms, SCM-Canterbury Press Limited (1994, 2004) ISBN 978-0334029533
- A Rabbi Reads the Bible (1991, 2004) ISBN 0-334-02952-X
- Bible Lives (1992). London: SCM (ISBN 0-334-00102-1)

== Articles ==
- "Jonah, Book Of" Anchor Bible Dictionary, 3:936-942
