= Danel =

Ugaritic culture hero

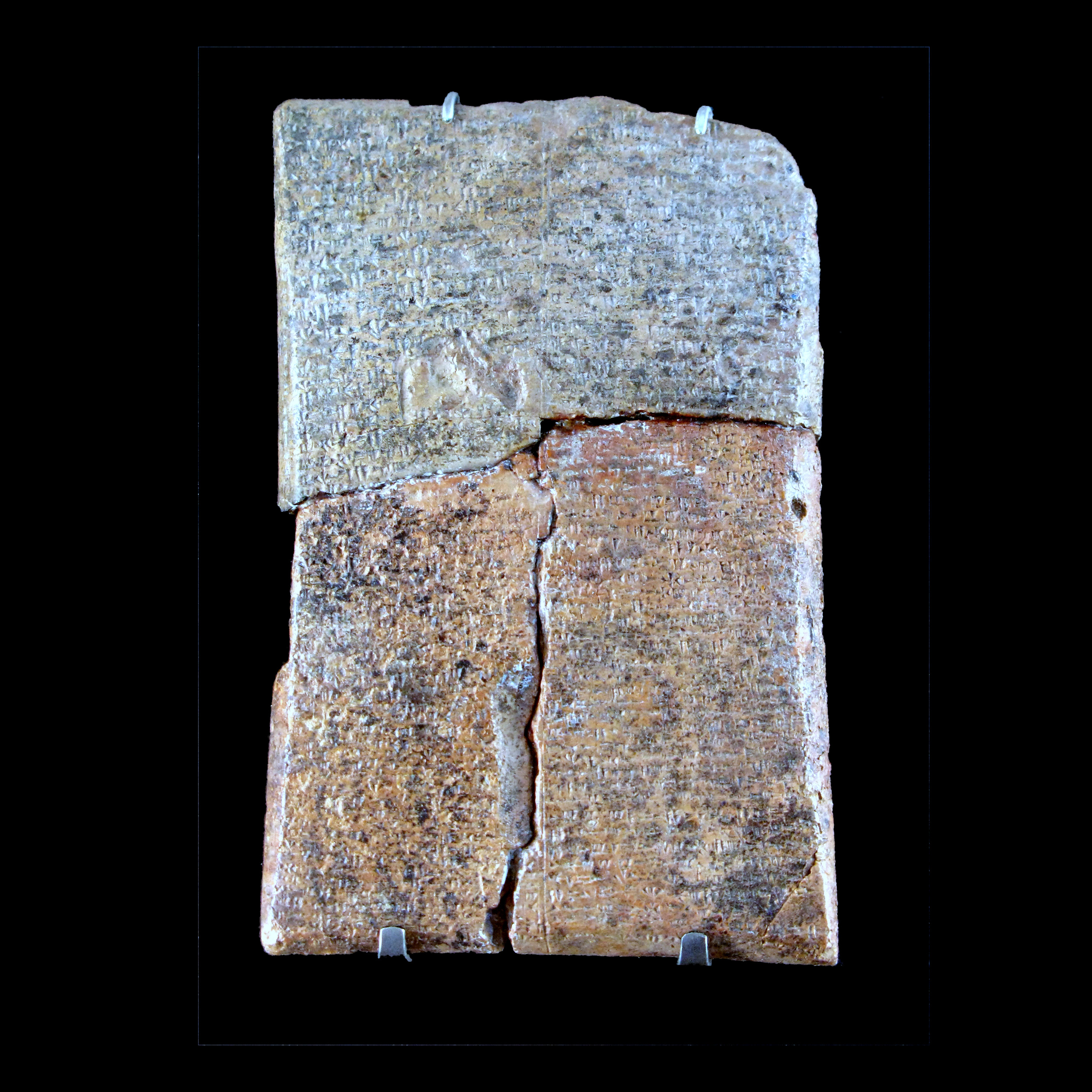
Tablet bearing part of the Danel epic, Louvre

Danel (/ˈdeɪnəl/, Ugaritic: 𐎄𐎐𐎛𐎍 DNỈL, "El is judge"), father of Aqhat, was a culture hero who appears in an incomplete Ugaritic text of the fourteenth century BCE at Ugarit (now Ras Shamra), Syria.

== Tale of Aqhat ==
The text in Corpus Tablettes Alphabétiques [CTA] 17–19 is often referred to as the Tale of Aqhat. Danel was depicted as "judging the cause of the widow, adjudicating the case of the fatherless" in the city gate. He passed through trials: his son Aqhat was destroyed but apparently in the missing conclusion was revived or replaced by Danel's patron god, Rpʼu, who sits and judges with Hadad and Astarte and was likely considered to be the equivalent of El.

The text was published and translated in 1936 by Charles Virolleaud and has been extensively analysed since then.

== The Rephaim ==
The text of The Rephaim, a title given to the text by Mark S. Smith, also mentions Danel, who appears there and in the Tale of Aqhat as "a model figure in family matters of life and death". In these texts Danel is mentioned as one who invites the Rephaim, divine beings of the underworld, to a feast during the late summer fruit harvest, reminiscent of Sukkot, one of the Three Pilgrimage Festivals in the Hebrew Bible.

Danel's title in the text of Rephaim is "the man of Rapau", who is identified in another Ugaritic text as a god and king of Ashtaroth and Edrei. Both cities are related to Og, the king of Bashan in the biblical account.

== Danel and the Book of Ezekiel ==
According to the Masoretic Text, three verses in the Book of Ezekiel (Ezekiel 14:14 and 20 and 28:3) refer to דנאל dnʾl which, according to the niqqud, should be read as "Daniel". This notwithstanding, parallels and contrasts with Danel (without an i) of Ezekiel, placed between Noah and Job and invoked as the very example of righteous judgement, first pointed out by René Dussaud in 1931, have led readers commonly to accept or occasionally to reject a degree of identification with Ugaritic Danel of the Tale of Aqhat, amounting virtually to the same figure.

The three figures referred to in Ezekiel 14:14 — "Even if Noah, Danel and Job were in it" — links the name with two non-Israelites of great antiquity. In Ezekiel 28:3, Danel is one noted for his wisdom in the prophecy addressed to the king of Tyre: "you are indeed wiser than Danel, no secret is hidden from you". The name "Danel" had a long tradition in Hebrew culture: he is supplied as the father-in-law of Enoch in the Book of Jubilees.

Texts in Ugaritic, a language closely related to the Canaanite languages, may provide an important clue. The language was discovered by French archaeologists in 1928 and known only from texts found in the lost city of Ugarit, Syria. Ugaritic has been used by scholars of the Hebrew Bible to clarify Biblical Hebrew texts and has revealed ways in which ancient Israelite culture finds parallels in the neighboring cultures. Ugaritic was "the greatest literary discovery from antiquity since the deciphering of the Egyptian hieroglyphs and Mesopotamian cuneiform."

Literary texts discovered at Ugarit include the "Tale of Aqhat" (or Legend of Danel), revealing a Canaanite religion. According to Edward L. Greenstein, a distinguished professor at Bar-Ilan University, Ugaritic texts solved the biblical puzzle of the anachronism of Ezekiel mentioning Daniel at Ezekiel 14:13–16; it is because in both Ugaritic and the Ancient Hebrew texts, it is correctly Danel—the yod is missing in the originals.

Danel would fit the pattern of being an ancient non-Israelite like Job and Noah. Ezekiel's literary arrangement may also support this position. Yahweh has compared Judah with foreign nations before (Ezekiel 5:7), and the context appears to contain a similar comparison in Ezekiel 14:13–19. The hypothetical rebellious country, while a cipher for Israel, is not explicitly named and could represent any ancient Near Eastern country. Ezekiel's audience is enamored with non-Israelite myths (cf. Tammuz in Ezekiel 8:14), and so they could easily be aware of King Danel's legendary virtues. Thus, if they were three ancient, righteous, non-Israelite men, Ezekiel's triad would fit the pattern of Yahweh judging Israel to some degree by the nations around them. The connection is more plausible when one considers that Ezekiel alludes to Danel in an oracle against Tyre (Ezekiel 28). Danel also had a son and, like Job, was unable to deliver him from divine harm (cf. Ezekiel 14:20).

== Recent uses ==
The name Danel has been given to one of the craters on Ganymede, a moon of Jupiter.

== See also ==
- Virtuous pagan
- Puġat
