= Ugaritic =

Extinct Northwest Semitic language

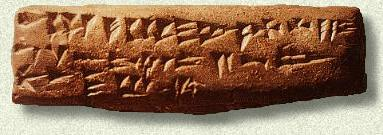
- Clay tablet of Ugaritic alphabet
- Native to: Ugarit
- Extinct: 12th century BC
- Language family: Afro-Asiatic: Semitic; West; Central; Northwest; Amorite?; Ugaritic
- Writing system: Ugaritic alphabet

Language codes
- ISO 639-2: uga
- ISO 639-3: uga
- Glottolog: ugar1238

Ugaritic (/ˌ(j)uːɡəˈrɪtɪk/ (Y)OOG-ə-RIT-ik) is an extinct Northwest Semitic language known through the Ugaritic texts discovered by French archaeologists in 1928 at Ugarit, including several major literary texts, notably the Baal cycle. The script is described as “a special alphabetic Cuneiform,” reflecting an idiom related to Canaanite and Hebrew languages.

Like Hebrew the short script of Ugarit has twenty-two characters, which are nearly identical to Hebrew in terms of their phonetic values, though not in terms of the visual elements or media of their inscription. Early samples of Hebrew are scratched on stone or potsherds whereas Ugaritic is punched on clay, like cuneiform.

A scholar of the period hailed Ugaritic as "the greatest literary discovery from antiquity since the deciphering of the Egyptian hieroglyphs and Mesopotamian cuneiform.”

== Corpus ==
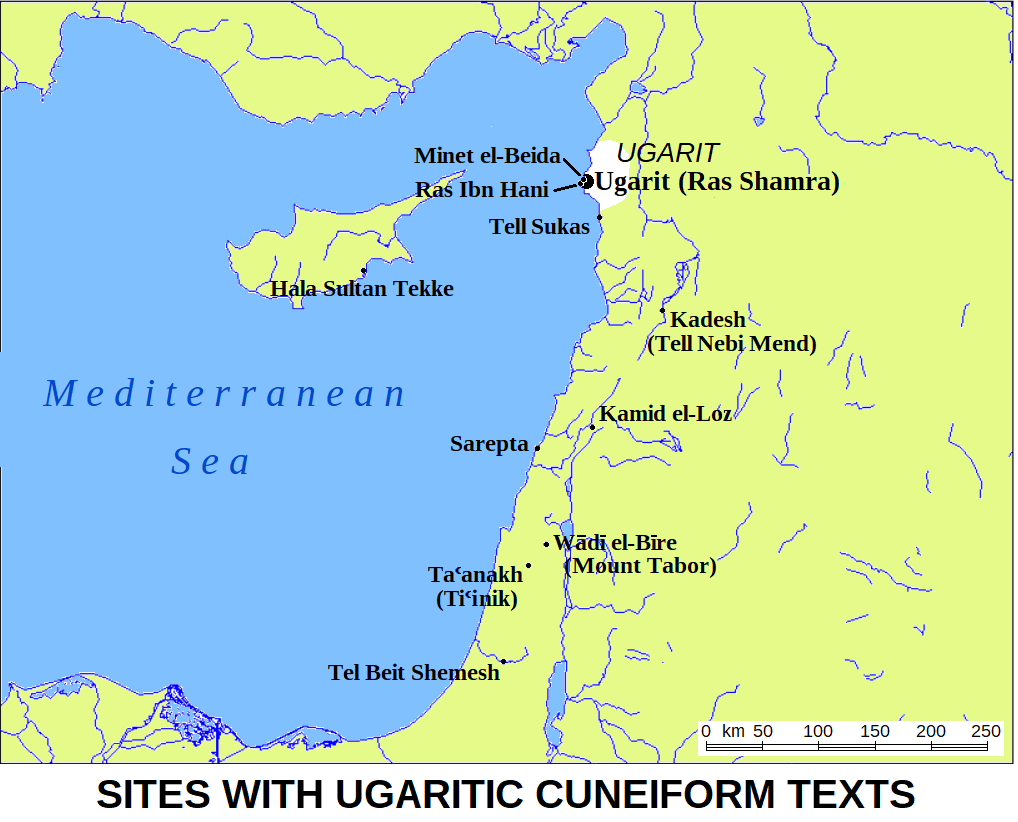
Sites where Ugaritic inscriptions have been found

The Ugaritic language is attested in texts from the 14th through the early 12th century BC. The city of Ugarit was destroyed roughly 1190 BC.

At Ras Shamra some 1800 inscriptions have been unearthed, as well as 150 at the so-called “Northern Palace” at Ras Ibn Hani (a few kilometers west of Ras Shamra), and two fragments (a handle and a cylinder seal) at Ugarit’s harbour at Minet el-Beida. Elsewhere too, in places such as Lebanon, Syria, Tel Beit Shemesh, and Cyprus, a few inscribed objects – handles, a sherd, a knife, an alphabet – have been found.

Literary texts discovered at Ugarit include the Legend of Keret or Kirta, the legends of Danel (AKA 'Aqhat), the Myth of Baal-Aliyan, and the Death of Baal. The latter two are also known collectively as the Baal Cycle. These texts reveal aspects of ancient Northwest Semitic religion in Syria-Canaan during the Late Bronze Age.

Edward Greenstein has proposed that Ugaritic texts might help solve biblical puzzles such as the anachronism of Ezekiel mentioning Daniel in Ezekiel 14:13–16 actually referring to Danel, a hero from the Ugaritic Tale of Aqhat.

== Phonology ==
Ugaritic had 28 consonantal phonemes (including two semivowels) and eight vowel phonemes (three short vowels and five long vowels): a ā i ī u ū ē ō. The phonemes ē and ō occur only as long vowels and are the result of monophthongization of the diphthongs аy and aw, respectively. Triphthongs too were contracted frequently: aya, iya > â; iyi > î; ăyu, iyu, uyu > û but āyu > â.

Consonants
		Labial	Interdental	Dental/Alveolar		Palatal	Velar	Uvular	Pharyngeal	Glottal
		Labial	Interdental	plain	emphatic	Palatal	Velar	Uvular	Pharyngeal	Glottal
Nasal		m		n						
Stop	voiceless	p		t	tˤ		k	q		ʔ
Stop	voiced	b		d			ɡ			
Fricative	voiceless		θ	s	sˤ	ʃ	x		ħ	h
Fricative	voiced		ð	z	ðˤ	(ʒ) (Note: The voiced palatal fricative [ʒ] occurs as a late variant of the voiced interdental fricative /ð/.)	ɣ (Note: The voiced velar fricative /ɣ/, while an independent phoneme at all periods, also occurs as a late variant of the emphatic voiced interdental /ðˤ/.)		ʕ	
Approximant				l		j	w			
Trill				r						

The following table shows Proto-Semitic phonemes and their correspondences among Ugaritic, Akkadian, Classical Arabic and Tiberian Hebrew:

Proto-Semitic	Ugaritic		Akkadian	Classical Arabic		Tiberian Hebrew		Imperial Aramaic	
ʾ [ʔ]	𐎀	ʾa [ʔa]	∅ / ʾ (a, i, u)	ء	ʾ [ʔ]	א	ʾ [ʔ]	𐡀/∅	ʾ/∅ [ʔ/∅]
ʾ [ʔ]	𐎛	ʾi [ʔi]	∅ / ʾ (a, i, u)	ء	ʾ [ʔ]	א	ʾ [ʔ]	𐡀/∅	ʾ/∅ [ʔ/∅]
ʾ [ʔ]	𐎜	ʾu [ʔu]	∅ / ʾ (a, i, u)	ء	ʾ [ʔ]	א	ʾ [ʔ]	𐡀/∅	ʾ/∅ [ʔ/∅]
b [b]	𐎁	b	b	ب	b [b]	ב	b/ḇ [b/v]	𐡁	b/ḇ [b/v]
g [ɡ]	𐎂	g	g	ج	ǧ [ɡʲ]→[dʒ]	ג	g/ḡ [ɡ/ɣ]	𐡂	g/ḡ [ɡ/ɣ]
d [d]	𐎄	d	d	د	d [d]	ד	d/ḏ [d/ð]	𐡃	d/ḏ [d/ð]
h [h]	𐎅	h	∅ / ʾ	ه	h [h]	ה	h [h]	𐡄	h [h]
w [w]	𐎆	w	w / ∅ / ʾ	و	w [w]	ו	w [w]	𐡅	w [w]
z [dz]	𐎇	z	z	ز	z [z]	ז	z [z]	𐡆	z [z]
ḏ [ð]	𐎏	d; sometimes ḏ [ð]	z	ذ	ḏ [ð]	ז	z [z]	𐡃 (older 𐡆)	d/ḏ [d/ð]
ḥ [ħ]	𐎈	ḥ [ħ]	∅ / ḫ / e	ح	ḥ [ħ]	ח	ḥ [ħ]	𐡇	ḥ [ħ]
ḫ [x]	𐎃	ḫ [x]	ḫ	خ	ḫ [x]	ח	ḥ [ħ]	𐡇	ḥ [ħ]
ṭ [tʼ]	𐎉	ṭ [tˤ]	ṭ	ط	ṭ [tˤ]	ט	ṭ [tˤ]	𐡈	ṭ [tˤ]
y [j]	𐎊	y	y / ʾ	ي	y [j]	י	y [j]	𐡉	y [j]
k [k]	𐎋	k	k	ك	k [k]	כ	k/ḵ [k/x]	𐡊	k/ḵ [k/x]
l [l]	𐎍	l	l	ل	l [l]	ל	l [l]	𐡋	l [l]
m [m]	𐎎	m	m	م	m [m]	מ	m [m]	𐡌	m [m]
n [n]	𐎐	n	n	ن	n [n]	נ	n [n]	𐡍	n [n]
s [ts]	𐎒	s	s	س	s [s]	ס	s [s]	𐡎	s [s]
s [ts]	𐎝	s_{2}	s	س	s [s]	ס	s [s]	𐡎	s [s]
ʿ [ʕ]	𐎓	ʿ [ʕ]	∅ / ʾ / ḫ / e	ع	ʿ [ʕ]	ע	ʿ [ʕ]	𐡏	ʿ [ʕ]
ġ [ɣ]	𐎙	ġ [ɣ]	∅ / ʾ / ḫ	غ	ġ [ɣ]	ע	ʿ [ʕ]	𐡏	ʿ [ʕ]
p [p]	𐎔	p	p	ف	f [f]	פ	p/p̄ [p/f]	𐡐	p/p̄ [p/f]
ṣ [tsʼ]	𐎕	ṣ [sˤ]	ṣ	ص	ṣ [sˤ]	צ	ṣ [sˤ]	𐡑	ṣ [sˤ]
ṣ́ [(t)ɬʼ]	𐎕	ṣ [sˤ]	ṣ	ض	ḍ [ɮˤ]→[dˤ]	צ	ṣ [sˤ]	𐡏 (older 𐡒)	ʿ [ʕ]
ṱ [θʼ]	𐎑	ẓ [ðˤ]; sporadically ġ [ɣ]	ṣ	ظ	ẓ [ðˤ]	צ	ṣ [sˤ]	𐡈 (older 𐡑)	ṭ [tˤ]
q [kʼ]	𐎖	q	q	ق	q [q]	ק	q [q]	𐡒	q [q]
r [r]	𐎗	r	r	ر	r [r]	ר	r [r]	𐡓	r [r]
ś [ɬ]	𐎌	š [ʃ]	š	ش	š [ʃ]	שׂ	ś [ɬ]→[s]	𐡎 (older 𐡔)	s [s]
š [s]	𐎌	š [ʃ]	š	س	s [s]	שׁ	š [ʃ]	𐡔	š [ʃ]
ṯ [θ]	𐎘	ṯ [θ]	š	ث	ṯ [θ]	שׁ	š [ʃ]	𐡕 (older 𐡔)	t/ṯ [t/θ]
t [t]	𐎚	t	t	ت	t [t]	ת	t/ṯ [t/θ]	𐡕	t/ṯ [t/θ]

== Writing system ==
Table of Ugaritic alphabet

The Ugaritic alphabet is a cuneiform script used beginning in the 15th century BC. Like most Semitic scripts, it is an abjad, where each symbol stands for a consonant, leaving the reader to supply the appropriate vowel. Only after an aleph is the vowel indicated (ʾa, ʾi, ʾu). With other consonants one can often guess the unwritten vowel, and thus vocalize the text, from (a) parallel cases with an aleph, (b) texts where Ugaritic words are written in Akkadian cuneiform syllables, (c) comparison with other West-Semitic languages, for example Hebrew and Arabic, (d) generalized vocalization rules, and (e), in poetry, parallelisms are also helpful to interpret the consonantal skeleton.

Clay tablets written in Ugaritic provide the earliest evidence of both the Levantine ordering of the alphabet, which gave rise to the alphabetic order of the Phoenician, Aramaic, Hebrew, Greek, and Latin alphabets; and the South Semitic order, which gave rise to the order of the Ge'ez script. The script was written from left to right.

The so-called "long alphabet" has 30 letters while the "short alphabet" has 22. Other languages (particularly Hurrian) were occasionally written in the Ugaritic alphabet, although no such inscriptions have been found outside of Ugarit.

The origins of the graphical choice and visual logic surrounding the letters of the alphabet are still debated and proving a single origin for the design remains difficult to this day.

== Grammar ==
Ugaritic is an inflected language, and as a Semitic language its grammatical features are highly similar to those found in Arabic, Hebrew, and Akkadian. It possesses two genders (masculine and feminine), three cases for nouns and adjectives (nominative, accusative, and genitive [also, note the possibility of a locative case]); three numbers: (singular, dual, and plural); and verb aspects similar to those found in other Northwest Semitic languages. The word order for Ugaritic is verb–subject–object (VSO), possessed–possessor (NG), and noun–adjective (NA). Ugaritic is considered a conservative Semitic language, since it retains most of the Proto-Semitic phonemes, the basic qualities of the vowel, the case system, the word order of the Proto-Semitic ancestor, and the lack of the definite article.

=== Morphology ===
Ugaritic, like all Semitic languages, exhibits a unique pattern of stems consisting typically of "triliteral", or 3-consonant consonantal roots (2- and 4-consonant roots also exist), from which nouns, adjectives, and verbs are formed in various ways: e.g. by inserting vowels, doubling consonants, and/or adding prefixes, suffixes, or infixes.

==== Verbs ====
===== Introduction =====
Ugaritic verbs are based on mostly three-literal roots (like all Semitic languages) (a few verbs have two- or four-consonant roots). For example, r-g-m, ‘to say’. By adding prefixes, infixes, and suffixes, and varying the vowels, the various verbal forms are formed. (Because in Ugaritic vowels are hardly written, these vowel variations often are not clearly visible).

Verbs can take several of a dozen stem patterns, or binyanim, that change the basic meaning of the verb, and make it for example passive, causative, or intensive. The basic form (in German: Grundstamm) is the G stem.

The verbal forms for each stem can be divided in five verbal form groups:

- the suffix conjugation, also called qtl (pronounced qatal), or perfect;
- the prefix conjugation, also called yqtl (pronounced yiqtol), or imperfect;
- imperatives;
- two infinitives;
- an active and a passive participle.

Verbs have one of three different vowel patterns, -a-, -i-, and -u-:

- in the qtl (G stem): qatala, qatila, or qatula (cf. Hebrew qaṭal, kavēd, qaṭon);
- in the yqtl (G stem): yiqtalu, yaqtilu, or yaqtulu.

There is no one-on-one link between morphology and tense (past, present or future). This is because Ugaritic is an aspect language: verbal forms do not primarily indicate the timing of activities, but they indicate aspect: the suffix conjugation (qtl) has perfective aspect, it is used when viewing an activity as having a completion; the prefix conjugation (yqtl) has imperfective aspect, it is used when it is deemed irrelevant whether the activity has an end or beginning.

Ugaritic verbs can have several moods, both indicative and injunctive (jussive, cohortative). Moods are most clearly visible in the prefix conjugation (see below).

===== Suffix conjugation =====
The suffix conjugation (qtl) has perfective aspect. Taking the root RGM (which means "to say") as an example, ragama may be translated as “he says” (at this very moment), or “he has said” (and has finished speaking).

The vowel between the second and third root consonant can be -a-, -i-, or -u-. Most verbs describe an activity (so-called “active verbs”) and have -a-. Verbs describing a state or property (“stative verbs”) have -i- or (rarely) -u-.

The paradigm of the suffix conjugation (or Perfect) is as follows for the a-verb RGM, the i-verb ŠBʿ (“to be (become) satiated”), and the u-verb MRṢ (“to fall ill”):

Morphology of the Ugaritic suffix conjugation (in the simple active pattern, G stem)
			model	a-verb			i-verb		u-verb	
Singular	1st	masc. & fem.	STEM**-tu**	rgmt	**R**a**G**a**M**tu	“I say, have said”	šabiʿtu	“I am satiated”	maruṣtu	“I fall ill, have fallen ill”
Singular	2nd	masculine	STEM**-ta**	rgmt	**R**a**G**a**M**ta	“you (m.) say”	šabiʿta	(etc.)	maruṣta	(etc.)
Singular	2nd	feminine	STEM**-ti**	rgmt	**R**a**G**a**M**ti	“you (f.) say”	šabiʿti		maruṣti	
Singular	3rd	masculine	STEM**-a**	rgm	**R**a**G**a**M**a	“he says”	šabiʿa		maruṣa	
Singular	3rd	feminine	STEM**-at**	rgmt	**R**a**G**a**M**at	“she says”	šabiʿat		maruṣat	
Dual	1st	masc. & fem.	STEM**-nayā**	rgmny	**R**a**G**a**M**nayā	“the both of us say”	šabiʿnayā		maruṣnayā	
Dual	2nd	masc. & fem.	STEM**-tumā**	rgmtm	**R**a**G**a**M**tumā	“you two say”	šabiʿtumā		maruṣtumā	
Dual	3rd	masculine	STEM**-ā**	rgm	**R**a**G**a**M**ā	“they both (m.) say”	šabiʿā		maruṣā	
Dual	3rd	feminine	STEM**-tā**	rgmt	**R**a**G**a**M**tā	“they both (f.) say”	šabiʿtā		maruṣtā	
Plural	1st	masc. & fem.	STEM**-nū** (?) (Note: Assumed form: there are no certain attestations of 1st person plural forms.)	rgmn (?)	**R**a**G**a**M**nū (?)	“we say”	šabiʿnū (?)		maruṣnū (?)	
Plural	2nd	masculine	STEM**-tum(u)**	rgmtm	**R**a**G**a**M**tum(u)	“you (m. Pl.) say”	šabiʿtum(u)		maruṣtum(u)	
Plural	2nd	feminine	STEM**-tin(n)a**	rgmtn	**R**a**G**a**M**tin(n)a	“you (f. Pl.) say”	šabiʿtin(n)a		maruṣtin(n)a	
Plural	3rd	masculine	STEM**-ū**	rgm	**R**a**G**a**M**ū	“they (m.) say”	šabiʿū		maruṣū	
Plural	3rd	feminine	STEM**-ā**	rgm	**R**a**G**a**M**ā	“they (f.) say”	šabiʿā		maruṣā	

===== Prefix conjugation =====
The prefix conjugation yqtl- takes three forms: yiqtal-, yaqtil-, and yaqtul-. The specific pattern is determined by the stem consonants. Therefore, there is no simple one-on-one relation with the three qtl vowel patterns, qatal, qatil, and qatul, because the qtl vowel pattern depends not on the consonant pattern, but on a verb's meaning (active or stative).

For example, the following three verbs all have a qtl of the qatal type, but their yqtl patterns differ:

verb		qtl		type	yqtl	
**QRʾ**	“to call, invoke”	qaraʾa	“he calls”	yiqtal-	yiqraʾu	“he will call”
**YRD**	“to go down”	yarada	“he goes down”	yaqtil-	yaridu	“he will go down”
**RGM**	“to say, speak”	ragama	“he says”	yaqtul-	yargumu	“he will say”

The Imperfect paradigms for the three patterns are as follows, for the verbs RGM, “to say” (yaqtul- pattern), ŠʾiL, “to ask” (yiqtal- pattern), and YRD, “to go down” (yaqtil pattern):

Morphology of the Ugaritic prefix conjugation (in the simple active pattern, G stem) (Note: The so-called “long” forms (e.g. 1 Singular ʾargumu, ending -u; 3 Plural targumūna, ending -na) are Imperfect, the “short” forms (ʾargum, without -u; targumū, without -na) Jussive.)
			model	yaqtul pattern			yiqtal pattern		yaqtil pattern	
Singular	1st	masc. & fem.	**ʾa/ʾi**-STEM-**(u)**	ʾargm	ʾa**RG**u**M**u	“I will say”	ʾišʾalu	“I will ask”	ʾaridu	“I will go down”
Singular	1st	masc. & fem.	**ʾa/ʾi**-STEM-**(u)**	ʾargm	ʾa**RG**u**M**	“may I say”	ʾišʾal	“may I ask”	ʾarid	“may I go down”
Singular	2nd	masculine	**ta/ti**-STEM-**(u)**	trgm	ta**RG**u**M**u	“you (m.) will say”	tišʾalu	(etc.)	taridu	(etc.)
Singular	2nd	masculine	**ta/ti**-STEM-**(u)**	trgm	ta**RG**u**M**	“may you (m.) say”	tišʾal	(etc.)	tarid	(etc.)
Singular	2nd	feminine	**ta/ti**-STEM-**ī(na)**	trgmn	ta**RG**u**M**īna	“you (f.) ...”	tišʾalīna		taridīna	
Singular	2nd	feminine	**ta/ti**-STEM-**ī(na)**	trgmn	ta**RG**u**M**ī	“may you (f.) ...”	tišʾalī		taridī	
Singular	3rd	masculine	**ya/yi**-STEM-**(u)**	yrgm	ya**RG**u**M**(u)	“... he ...”	yišʾal(u)		yarid(u)	
Singular	3rd	feminine	**ta/ti**-STEM-**(u)**	trgm	ta**RG**u**M**(u)	“... she ...”	tišʾal(u)		tarid(u)	
Dual	1st	masc. & fem.	**na/ni**-STEM-**ā** (?)	nrgm (?)	na**RG**u**M**ā (?)	“... the both of us ...”	nišʾalā (?)		naridā (?)	
Dual	2nd	masc. & fem.	**ta/ti**-STEM-**ā(ni)** (Note: Vocalization not certain: -(ni) [Sivan (2001), p. 111] may also be -(na) [Bordreuil & Pardee (2009), p. 51].)	trgm(n)	ta**RG**u**M**ā(ni)	“... you two ...”	tišʾalā(ni)		taridā(ni)	
Dual	3rd	masculine	**ta/ti**-STEM-**ā(ni)**; also **ya/yi**-STEM-**ā(ni)**	trgm(n) or yrgm(n)	ta**RG**u**M**ā(ni) or ya**RG**u**M**ā(ni)	“... they both (m.) ...”	tišʾalā(ni) or yišʾalā(ni)		taridā(ni) or yaridā(ni)	
Dual	3rd	feminine	**ta/ti**-STEM-**ā(ni)**	trgm(n)	ta**RG**u**M**ā(ni)	“... they both (f.) ...”	tišʾalā(ni)		taridā(ni)	
Plural	1st	masc. & fem.	**na/ni**-STEM-**(u)**	nrgm	na**RG**u**M**(u)	“... we ...”	nišʾal(u)		narid(u)	
Plural	2nd	masculine	**ta/ti**-STEM-**ū(na)**	trgm(n)	ta**RG**u**M**ū(na)	“... you (m. Pl.) ...”	tišʾalū(na)		taridū(na)	
Plural	2nd	feminine	**ta/ti**-STEM-**na**	trgmn	ta**RG**u**M**na	“... you (f. Pl.) ...”	tišʾalna		taridna	
Plural	3rd	masculine	**ta/ti**-STEM-**ū(na)**; rarely: **ya/yi**-STEM-**ū(na)**	trgm(n) or yrgm(n)	ta**RG**u**M**ū(na) or ya**RG**u**M**ū(na)	“... they (m.) ...”	tišʾalū(na) or yišʾalū(na)		taridū(na) or yaridū(na)	
Plural	3rd	feminine	**ta/ti**-STEM-**ū(na)**	trgmn	ta**RG**u**M**ū(na)	“... they (f.) ...”	tišʾalū(na)		taridū(na)	

The prefix conjugation takes four or five different endings (yqtl, yqtlu, yqtla, yqtln). There are three clear moods (indicative, jussive, and volitive or cohortative). The so-called energic forms, yqtln, with an -n suffix (-an, -anna; possibly also -un, -unna), apparently have the same meaning as the shorter forms without the -n suffix.

Form	Name	Mood	Tense	Aspect	Example	Translation	Notes
yqtlu	Imperfect	Indicative	Present – Future	imperfective	yargumu	“he says, will say”	
yqtlu	Imperfect	Indicative	Past	continued action	yargumu	“he used to say, is wont to say”	
yqtl	‘short form’	Indicative	Past	imperfective	yargum	“he said”	
yqtl	‘short form’	Jussive	—	—	yargum	“may he say, let him say”	
yqtla	Volitive	Volitive (Cohortative, Subjunctive)	—	—	yarguma	“may he say, he shall say”	
yqtln	Energic	Jussive	—	—	yarguman(na)	“may he say”	
yqtln	Energic #2	Indicative	Past	imperfective	yargumun(na)	“he said, says”	existence doubted

===== Imperative =====
The imperative takes three forms, qatal, qitil, and qutul, where the vowels are equal to the second vowel of the imperfect. So, if the imperfect is yaqtul-, the imperative is qutul; if yaqtil-, then qitil; if yiqtal-, then qatal.

Examples (the verb YRD “to go down, to descend” is a so-called ‘weak’ verb, the first consonant Y disappears in the imperative):

		a-type		i-type		u-type		
	verb:	PTḤ, “to open”		YRD, “to descend”		RGM, “to say, speak”		(speaking to:)
(Imperfect, 3 Sg. m.:)		yiptaḥu	“he will open”	yaridu	“he will descend”	yargumu	“he will say”	(speaking to:)
Imperative, 2 Singular	masculine	pataḥ	“open!”	rid	“descend!”	rugum	“say!”, “speak!”	a man
Imperative, 2 Singular	feminine	pataḥī	“open!”	ridī	“descend!”	rugumī	“say!”, “speak!”	a woman
2 Dual	masculine	pataḥā	“open!”	ridā (?)	“descend!”	rugumā	“say!”, “speak!”	two men
2 Dual	feminine	pataḥā	“open!”	ridā (?)	“descend!”	rugumā	“say!”, “speak!”	two women
2 Plural	masculine	pataḥū	“open!”	ridū	“descend!”	rugumū	“say!”, “speak!”	three or more men, or men and women
2 Plural	feminine	pataḥā (?)	“open!”	ridā (?)	“descend!”	rugumā (?)	“say!”, “speak!”	three or more women

===== Participles =====
The paradigm of the active participle of G stems is as follows (verb MLK, “to be king”):

Singular	masculine	māliku	“reigning (king)”
Singular	feminine	mālik(a)tu	“reigning (queen)”
Plural	masculine	mālikūma	“reigning (kings)”
Plural	feminine	mālikātu	“reigning (queens)”

The passive participle is quite rare. There seem to be three forms (verbs RGM “to say”, ḤRM “to divide”, YDD [< *WDD] “to love”):

		u-form		i-form		ma- prefix	
Singular	masculine	ragūmu	“said, spoken”	ḥarimu	“divided”	môdūdu (< mawdūdu) (or mêdūdu, < maydūdu)	“beloved, friend(s)”
Singular	feminine	ragūm(a)tu	“said, spoken”	ḥarim(a)tu	“divided”	môdūdatu (or mêdūdatu)	“beloved, friend(s)”
Plural	masculine	ragūmūma	“said, spoken”	ḥarimūma	“divided”	môdūdūma (or mêdūdūma)	“beloved, friend(s)”
Plural	feminine	ragūmātu	“said, spoken”	ḥarimātu	“divided”	môdūdātu (or mêdūdātu)	“beloved, friend(s)”

Other stems than the G (and N) stem form their passive participles only by means of a m- prefix; for example mulaḫḫišu (“conjuror”, D stem LḪŠ “to whisper”), mušamṭiru (“[the god] who rains”, Š stem, MṬR “to rain down”).

===== Infinitives =====
Like other Semitic languages, Ugaritic has two infinitives, the infinitive absolute and the infinitive construct. However, in Ugaritic the two have an identical form. The usual form is halāku (“to go”, verb hlk), but a few verbs use an alternative form *hilku, for example niģru, “to guard” (verb nģr).

The infinitive absolute is often used preceding a perfect or imperfect verbal form, to put emphasis on that following verbal form. Such an infinive absolute may be translated as “verily, certainly, absolutely”. For example, halāku halaka, “he certainly goes” (literally, “to go! he goes”). An isolated infinitive absolute may also be used instead of any perfect, imperfect, or imperative verbal form.

The infinitive construct is often used after the prepositions lê (“to”) and bi (“in, by”): bi-šaʾāli “in asking, by asking, while asking” (verb šʾal “to ask”; note that after the preposition b (bi) the genitive of the infinitive is used).

===== Patterns (stems) =====
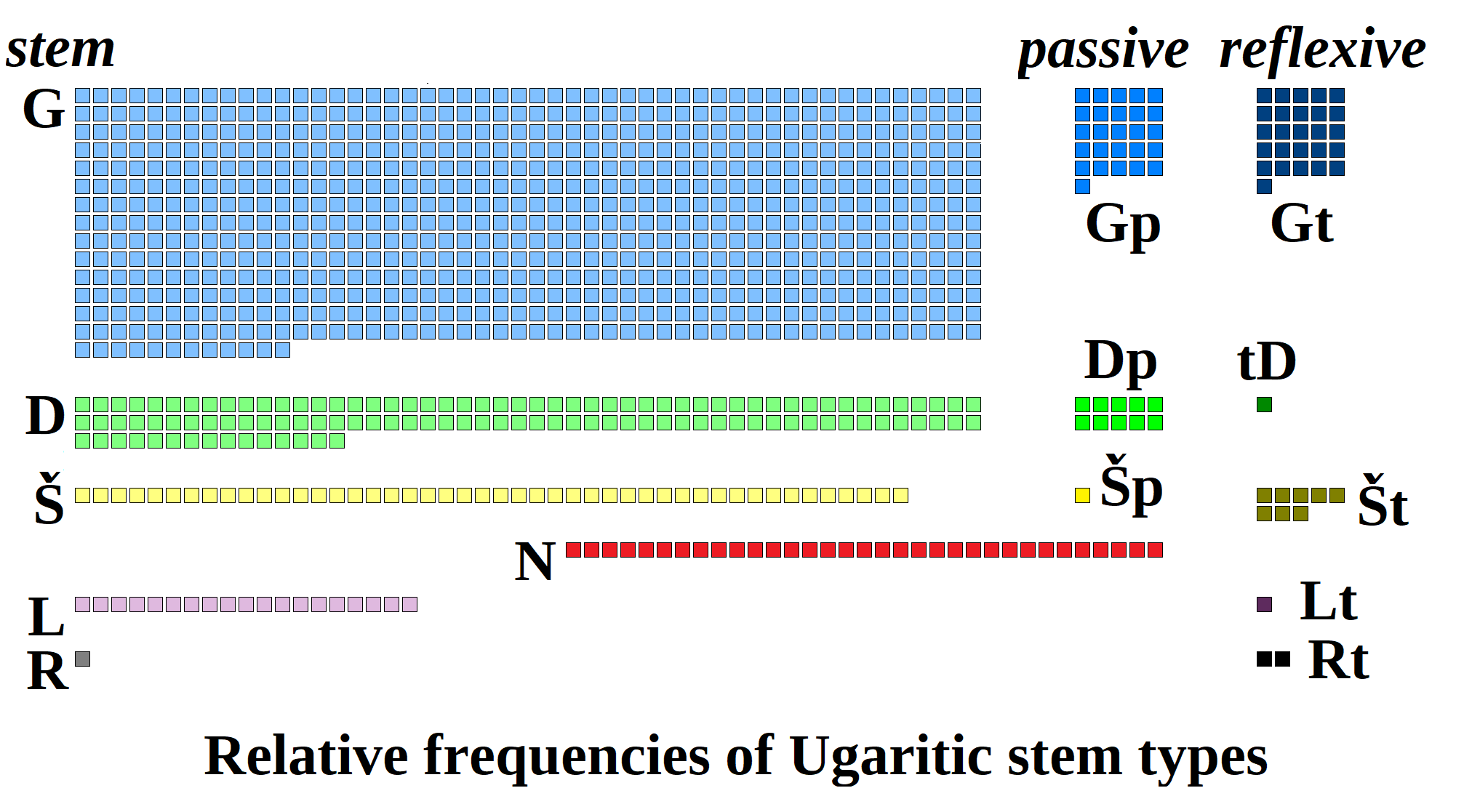
Relative frequencies of Ugaritic stem types in a representative text sample

Ugaritic verbs occur in about a dozen reconstructed patterns or binyanim (verb RGM, “to say”, unless indicated otherwise): The large majority of verbal forms (about 70%) belong to the G stem (German: Grundstamm, “basic stem”).

	Hebrew equivalent	Verb	Perfect (3rd sg. masc.)	Imperfect (3rd sg. masc.)	Imperative (2nd sg. masc.)	Infinitive	Participle (sg. masc.)
**G stem** (simple)	qal	“to say”	ragama, “he says, said”	yargumu, “he will say, said, used to say”	rugum, “say!”	ragāmu, rigmu, “to say”	rāgimu, “saying; one who says”
**Gp stem** (passive of **G**)	qal passive	“to be said”	rugima	yurgamu	—	?	ragūmu / ragimu / margūmu
(?) **C stem** (causative internal pattern)	—	**MLK**, “to reign” → “to enthrone”	—	yamliku (Note: The i-form imperfect of the G stem (or D stem?) sometimes has causative meaning. It probably is not a separate stem: Sivan (2001), pp. 116–117.)	—	—	—
**Gt stem** (simple reflexive)	—	“to speak to oneself”	ʾirtagima	yirtagimu (or yirtagamu?)	ʾirtagim	?	murtagimu
**N stem** (reciprocal or passive)	niphʻal	“to speak to each other; to be said”	nargama	yirragimu (< *yinragimu)	ʾirragim	nargamu	nargamu
**D stem** (factitive / causative, or intensive)	piʻʻel	“to speak loudly”	raggima	yaraggimu	raggim	ruggamu	muraggimu
**Dp stem** (passive of **D**)	puʻʻal	“to be said loudly”	ruggima	yuraggamu	—	?	muraggamu
**tD stem** (reflexive of **D**)	hithpaʻʻel	“to speak loudly to oneself”	taraggima	yataraggimu	taraggim	?	?
**L stem** (intensive or factitive)	pôlel	**RWM**, “to raise up”	?	yarāmimu	rāmim	rammu	murāmimu
**Lp stem** (passive of **L**)	pôlal	**RWM**, “to be raised up”	?	yurāmamu	—	?	murāmamu
**Š stem** (causative)	hiphʻil	“to make someone speak”	šargima	yašargimu	šargim	šurgamu	mušargimu
**Šp stem** (passive of **Š**)	hophʻal	“to be made to speak”	šurgima	yušargamu	—	?	mušargamu
**Št stem** (causative reflexive)	hištaphʿal	“to make someone speak to himself”	ʾištargima	yištargimu	?	?	muštargimu
**R stem** (factitive) (reduplicated roots) (Note: This includes reduplicated bi- (like KRKR, “to twiddle one's fingers”) and triconsonant roots (ṢḤRR, “to scorch”), as well as other four-consonant roots (PRSḤ, “to bow, collapse(?)”).)	—	**KRKR**, “to twiddle one's fingers”	karkara	yakarkaru	?	?	?
**Rt or tR stem** (factitive-reflexive) (?)	—	**YPY**, “to be beautiful” → “to make yourself beautiful”	?	yîtapêpû or yîtêpêpû (Note: yîtapêpû < yiYtaPaYPiYu (Rt) or yîtêpêpû < yitaYPaYPiYu (tR) (with reduplication of PY; attested only once: Bordreuil & Pardee (2009), pp. 44–45).)	?	?	?

===== Weak Verbs =====
In Ugaritic, “weak verbs” are verbs whose roots contain a weak consonant, that is, a consonant that may disappear in some forms (in particular the imperative), or change into another consonant (some imperfect forms). Weak consonants are w and y, and also n if it is the first root consonant. Verbs with only two root consonants are weak too.

Due to their weak consonants, weak verbs can undergo phonetic changes, such as the assimilation of waw (w) to yod (y), especially in the absence of an intervening vowel. This characteristic impacts the verb's inflection, resulting in variations that are atypical compared to regular (strong) verbs. This phenomenon is akin to that observed in other Semitic languages, including Hebrew.

The following list shows the various classes of weak verbs. Weak forms are shown in bold, the strong verb RGM is shown for comparison:

Class	Characteristics (weak consonants)	Example		Perfect (3 sing. masc.)	Imperfect (3 sing. masc.	Imperative (2 sing. masc.)	Infinitive	Participle (sing. masc.)
strong		RGM	“to say”	ragama	yargumu	rugum	ragāmu, rigmu	rāgimu
I-n	1st root consonant n; also h in HLK and l in LQḤ	NPL	“to fall”	napala	**yappulu**	**pul** (?)	napālu	nāpilu
I-n	1st root consonant n; also h in HLK and l in LQḤ	HLK	“to go”	halaka	**yaliku**	**lik**	halāku, hilku	hāliku
I-n	1st root consonant n; also h in HLK and l in LQḤ	LQḤ	“to take”	laqaḥa	**yiqqaḥu**	**qaḥ**	laqāḥu	lāqiḥu
I-wy	1st consonant w or y	YRD	“to descend”	yarada	**yaridu**	**rid**	yarādu	yāridu
II-w	2nd consonant w	QWM (QM)	“to stand”	**qāma**	**yaqūmu**	**qum** (?)	**qāmu / qūmu**	**qāmu**
II-y	2nd consonant y	BYN (BN)	“to understand”	**bīna (?)**	**yabīnu** (?)	**bin**	**bînu**	**bīnu** / **bēnu** (?)
III-y	3rd consonant y (or w)	ʿLY	“to ascend”	ʿalaya, **ʿalâ**	**yaʿlû**	**ʿilî**	ʿalāyu, ʿilyu	ʿāliyu
II-gem	two root consonants, 2nd cons. doubled (“geminated”)	SBB	“to turn around”	sabba	yasubbu	**sub** (?)	sibbu (?)	sabbu

In Ugaritic there also exist "doubly weak verbs", which contain two weak consonants.

==== Nouns and adjectives ====
===== Paradigm =====
Nouns (substantives, adjectives, personal names) in their basic form (nominative singular) end in -u. Nominal forms are categorized according to their inflection into: cases (nominative, genitive, and accusative), state (absolute and construct), gender (masculine and feminine), and number (singular, dual, and plural).

Here is the full paradigm for a masculine substantive (malku, “king”) and a feminine substantive (malkatu, “queen”).

		Masculine						Feminine					
		ending		malku, “king”				ending		malkatu, “queen”			
number	case	abs. state	cs. state	absolute state		construct state		abs. state	cs. state	absolute state		construct state	
Singular	nominative	**-u**		mlk	malk**u**			**-u**		mlkt	malkat**u**		
Singular	genitive	**-i** (Note: -a for diptotes)		mlk	malk**i**			**-i**		mlkt	malkat**i**		
Singular	accusative	**-a**		mlk	malk**a**			**-a**		mlkt	malkat**a**		
Dual	nominative	**-āma** (or **-āmi**?)	**-ā**	mlkm	malk**āma** / malk**āmi**	mlk	malk**ā**	**-āma / -āmi**	**-ā**	mlktm	malkat**āma** / malkat**āmi**	mlkt	malkat**ā**
Dual	gen. & acc.	**-êma** (or **-êmi**?)	**-ê**	mlkm	malk**êma** / malk**êmi**	mlk	malk**ê**	**-êma / -êmi**	**-ê**	mlktm	malkat**êma** / malkat**êmi**	mlkt	malkat**ê**
Plural	nominative	**-ūma**	**-ū**	mlkm	mal(a)k**ūma**	mlk	malak**ū**	(*)**-u**		mlkt	mal(a)k**ā**t**u**		
Plural	gen. & acc.	**-īma**	**-ī**	mlkm	mal(a)k**īma**	mlk	malak**ī**	(*)**-i**		mlkt	mal(a)k**ā**t**i**		

Note (*): with lengthening of the final vowel of the stem: mal(a)kat- > mal(a)kāt-.

===== Case =====
Ugaritic has three grammatical cases corresponding to: nominative, genitive, and accusative. Normally, singular nouns take the ending -u in the nominative, -i in the genitive and -a in the accusative. After prepositions as a rule the genitive is used. The accusative is also used adverbially (ṭābu, “good” > ṭāba, “well”) and as a kind of locative (šamîma = “to the heavens, in heaven”). More often, a locative is formed by appending a suffix -h to the accusative: ʾarṣu, “earth”, accusative ʾarṣa, locative ʾarṣah, “earthward”. There is no dative; instead the preposition lê, “to, for”, + genitive is used.

As in Arabic, some exceptional nouns and personal names (known as diptotes) have the suffix -a in the genitive, thus making it equal to the accusative. There is no Ugaritic equivalent for Classical Arabic nunation or Akkadian mimation.

===== State =====
Nouns in Ugaritic occur in two states: absolute and construct. The construct (or ‘bound’) state indicates that a noun is closely linked to the following noun. For example, “the house of the king” could in Ugaritic in principle be expressed in two ways:

1. “the house” (absolute state) “of the king” (absolute state, genitive). This might be called the ‘Latin’ way of expression (domus regis);

2. “the house of” (construct state) “the king” (absolute state, genitive). This might be called the ‘Hebrew’ way of expression (bēt hammelek).

The construct state is also the basic form used when a personal pronoun is suffixed: malakūma = “(the) kings” (absolute state, nominative) > malakū (construct state) > malakūhu = “his kings”; similarly malakĩhu = “(of) his kings” (genitive, accusative).

Ugaritic, unlike Arabic and Hebrew, has no definite article.

===== Gender =====
Nouns which have no gender marker are for the most part masculine, although some feminine nouns do not have a feminine marker. However, these denote feminine beings such as ʼumm- (mother). /-t/ is the feminine marker which is directly attached to the base of the noun.

===== Number =====
Ugaritic distinguishes between nouns based on quantity. All nouns are either singular when there is one, dual when there are two, and plural if there are three or more.

- The **singular** has no marker and is inflected according to its case (malku, “king”: genitive malki, accusative malka).
- The marker for the **dual** in the absolute state appears as /-m/. However, the vocalization may be reconstructed as /-āma/ or /-āmi/ in the nominative (such as malkāma, malkāmi "two kings") and /-êma/ or /-êmi/ for the genitive and accusative (e.g. malkêma, malkêmi). For the construct state, it is /-ā/ and /-ê/ respectively.
- Masculine absolute state **plurals** take the forms -ūma in the nominative and -īma in the genitive and accusative. In the construct state they are -ū and -ī respectively. There are a few irregular (or broken) plurals; for example bt (bêtu), “house”, plural bhtm (bahatūma); and bn (binu), “son”, plural banūma (with Ablaut).

The female afformative plural is /-āt/ with a case marker probably following the /-t/, giving /-ātu/ for the nominative and /-āti/ for the genitive and accusative in both absolute and construct state.

===== Adjectives =====
Adjectives follow the noun and are declined exactly like the preceding noun.

==== Pronouns ====
===== Independent personal pronouns =====
Independent personal pronouns in Ugaritic are as follows (some forms are lacking because they are not in the corpus of the language):

person	gender	case	Singular		Dual		Plural	
1st			**ʾn** (ʾanā) and **ʾnk** (ʾanāku)	“I”	?	“we two”	**ʾanḥn**? (ʾanaḥnu?) (Note: Educated guess, based on related languages; “we” has not yet been found in Ugaritic texts.)	“we”
2nd	masculine		**ʾat** (ʾatta)	“you (m.)”	**ʾatm** (ʾattumā)	“you two”	**ʾatm** (ʾattumu)	“you all (m.)”
2nd	feminine		**ʾat** (ʾatti)	“you (f.)”	**ʾatm** (ʾattumā)	“you two”	**ʾatn**? (ʾattina?)	“you all (f.)”
3rd	masculine	nominative	**hw** (huwa)	“he”	**hm**? (humā?)	“them two”	**hm**? (humū?)	“they”
3rd	masculine	gen., acc.	**hwt** (huwāti)	“him”	**hm**? (humā?)	“them two”	**hmt** (humutu?)	“them”
3rd	feminine	nominative	**hy** (hiya)	“she”	**hm**? (humā?)	“them two (f.)”	**hn** (hinna)	“they (f.)”
3rd	feminine	gen., acc.	**hyt** (hiyāti)	“her”	**hmt** (humāti?)	“them two (f.)”	**hmt** (humūti?)	“them (f.)”

===== Suffixed (or enclitic) personal pronouns =====
Suffixed (or enclitic) pronouns (mainly denoting the genitive and accusative) are as follows:

Person	Gender	Case	Singular				Dual		Plural	
Person	Gender	Case	after nouns	after prepositions	after verbs		Dual		Plural	
1st	m. & f.	nominative	-— (-î)		**-n** (-nī)	“me, my”	**-ny** (-nayā / -niyā)	“us, our”	**-n** (-nā / -nū)	“us, our”
1st	m. & f.	gen., acc.	**-y** (-ya)		**-n** (-nī)	“me, my”	**-ny** (-nayā / -niyā)	“us, our”	**-n** (-nā / -nū)	“us, our”
2nd	masculine		**-k** (-ka)			“you, your”	**-km** (-kumā)	“you, your”	**-km** (-kumū?)	“you, your”
2nd	feminine		**-k** (-ki)			“you, your (f.)”	**-km** (-kumā)	“you, your”	**-kn** (-kin(n)a)	“you, your (f.)”
3rd	masculine	nominative	**-h** (-hu)			“him, his”	**-hm** (-humā?)	“them, their”	**-hm** (-humū?)	“them, their”
3rd	masculine	gen., acc.	**-h** (-hu)	**-h** (-hu) (also **-nh, -n, -nn**: -annahu, -annu, -annannu) (Note: The ‘long’ suffixes, with extra -n-, are rare after prepositions—an example is ʿmnh, ʿimmannaha, “after her”. After verbs the long suffixes are quite common.)		“him, his”	**-hm** (-humā?)	“them, their”	**-hm** (-humū?)	“them, their”
3rd	feminine	nominative	**-h** (-ha)			“her”	**-hm** (-humā?)	“them, their”	**-hn** (-hin(n)a)	“them, their (f.)”
3rd	feminine	gen., acc.	**-h** (-ha)	**-h** (-ha) (also **-nh, -n, -nn**: -annaha, -anna, -annanna?)		“her”	**-hm** (-humā?)	“them, their”	**-hn** (-hin(n)a)	“them, their (f.)”

===== Other pronouns =====
The relative (or ‘determinative’) pronoun is d (dū), “that of, of which”; often simply translatable as “who, which”. It introduces a specification, property, or action by the subject and is congruent with the governing noun. Declension: dī, dā; feminine dt (dātu, dāti, dāta); plural dt (dūtu, dūti(?)).

The demonstrative (or ‘deictic’) pronouns are hnd (hānādū), “this”, and hnk (hānākā) “that”. Extended forms are hanadūna, hanadūti, hanamati.

Interrogative pronouns are my (mīyu) “who?”, and mh (maha) “what?”.

Indefinite pronouns seem to be derived from the interrogative pronoun by appending to them the particles -n(a)-, -k(a), and/or -m(a) (in that order). Thus, for example: mnkm (mīnukumu?) and mnm (mīnama?) “anyone, someone”, mhkm (mahkīma?) and mnm (mannama?) “anything, something, whatever”.

==== Numerals ====
The following is a table of Ugaritic numerals (some vocalisations are conjectural):

Number	used with Masculine nouns only		used with Masc. or Fem. nouns		used with Feminine nouns only		notes
1	ʼaḥd	ʼaḥḥadu			**ʼaḥt**	ʼaḥḥattu	
2			ṯn	ṯinā (+nominative), ṯinê (+gen., acc.)	**ṯt**	ṯittā (+nominative), ṯittê (+gen., acc.)	
3	ṯlṯt	ṯalāṯatu	ṯlṯ	ṯalāṯu			“3” ... “10”: seemingly feminine forms, ending in **-t**, are used with masculine nouns, and vice versa (Semitic gender dissymmetry)
4	ʾarbʿt	ʾarbaʿatu	ʾarbʿ	ʾarbaʿu			“3” ... “10”: seemingly feminine forms, ending in **-t**, are used with masculine nouns, and vice versa (Semitic gender dissymmetry)
5	ḫmšt	ḫamišatu	ḫmš	ḫamišu			“3” ... “10”: seemingly feminine forms, ending in **-t**, are used with masculine nouns, and vice versa (Semitic gender dissymmetry)
6	ṯṯt	ṯiṯṯatu	ṯṯ	ṯiṯṯu			“3” ... “10”: seemingly feminine forms, ending in **-t**, are used with masculine nouns, and vice versa (Semitic gender dissymmetry)
7	šbʿt	šabʿatu	šbʿ	šabʿu			“3” ... “10”: seemingly feminine forms, ending in **-t**, are used with masculine nouns, and vice versa (Semitic gender dissymmetry)
8	ṯmnt	ṯamānîtu	ṯmn	ṯamānû			“3” ... “10”: seemingly feminine forms, ending in **-t**, are used with masculine nouns, and vice versa (Semitic gender dissymmetry)
9	tšʿt	tišʿatu	tšʿ	tišʿu			“3” ... “10”: seemingly feminine forms, ending in **-t**, are used with masculine nouns, and vice versa (Semitic gender dissymmetry)
10	ʿšrt	ʿašratu	ʿšr	ʿašru			“3” ... “10”: seemingly feminine forms, ending in **-t**, are used with masculine nouns, and vice versa (Semitic gender dissymmetry)
11	ʿšt ʿšrh	ʿaštê ʿišrêh (ʿašrihu?)	ʿšt ʿšr	ʿaštê ʿašru			
12	ṯn ʿšrh / ṯn ʿšrt	ṯinā ʿišrêh (ʿašrihu?) / ṯinā ʿašratu	ṯn ʿšr	ṯinā ʿašru			
13	ṯlṯt ʻšrh / ṯlṯt ʿšrt	ṯalāṯatu ʿišrêh (ʿašrihu?) / ṯalāṯatu ʿašratu	ṯlṯ ʿšr	ṯalāṯu ʿašru			“14” ... “19” similarly
20			ʿšrm	ʿašrāma			dual of ʿašru, “10”
30			ṯlṯm	ṯalāṯūma			«plural» form of ṯalāṯu, “3”; “40” ... “90” similarly
100			mʾit	miʾtu			
200			mʾitm	miʾtāma			dual of miʾtu, “100”
300			ṯlṯ mʾat	ṯalāṯu miʾātu			“400” ... “900” similarly
1000			ʾalp	ʾalpu			
2000			ʾalpm	ʾalpāma			dual of ʾalpu, “1000”
3000			ṯlṯ ʾalpm	ṯalāṯu ʾalpūma			
10,000			rbt	ribbatu			
20,000			rbtm	ribbatāma			dual of ribbatu, “10,000”
30,000			ṯlṯ rbbt	ṯalāṯu ribabātu			

Numerals are declined just like other nouns, for example ʾarbaʿu (“4”): genitive ʾarbaʿi, accusative ʾarbaʿa.

===== Ordinals =====
The following is a table of Ugaritic ordinals. The vocalisations (predominantly based on comparison with Hebrew, Aramaic and Arabic) are very uncertain:

Number	written as	vocalisation (??)
1st	**prʿ** or **ʾaḥd**	parīʿu or ʾaḥḥīdu
2nd	**ṯn**	ṯanû
3rd	**ṯlṯ**	ṯalīṯu
4th	**rbʿ**	rabīʿu
5th	**ḫmš**	ḫamīšu
6th	**ṯdṯ**	ṯadīṯu
7th	**šbʿ**	šabīʿu
8th	**ṯmn**	ṯamīnu
9th	**tšʿ**	tašīʿu
10th	**ʿšr**	ʿašīru

==== Particles ====
Among particles in Ugaritic the so-called enclitic particles deserve special note, especially -n (-na) and -m (-ma). These particles do not seem to change the meaning of words, but create confusion between different forms, and thus complicate the analysis and interpretation of words, in particular verbal forms. For example, rgmtm can be ragamtumu, “you (plural) say”, but it can also be ragamtu-ma, an extension of ragamtu, “I have said”. And mlkm (malkuma), can be the plural malkûma, “kings”, but it can also be an extended singular, malku-ma, “the king”.

The enclitic particles can be stacked on top of each other. An extreme example is hnny (hannaniya), “behold!, here is”, that is analyzed as a four-step extension of the presentative particle h (ha): hnny (hannaniya) = ha + -n + -na + -ni + -ya. h and hnny have the same meaning, “behold!, here is”.

== Poetic techniques ==
Techniques often encountered in Ugaritic poetry are repetition, parallelisms, chiasms, epithets, and what might be called ‘numerical stairs’.

An example of repetition is in a part of the Baʿal myth cycle, where Baʿal’s fight with the Sea god Yammu (also known as Naharu) is described (KTU^{2} 1.2, col. IV). Divine artisan Kothar makes a magic mace for Baʿal and, speaking to the mace, instructs it what to do:

Ugaritic	vocalized	English
(14-15) hlm . ktp [.] zbl [.] ym [.] bn ydm / [ṭp]ṭ . nhr	hulum katipa zabūli Yammi, bêna yadêma ṯāpiṭi Nahari	“Strike! the shoulder of Prince Yammu!, between the arms of Ruler Naharu!”

The phrase is repeated, with subtle variation, to describe the fight:

(16–17) ylm . ktp . zbl ym . bn [.] ydm [.] ṭpṭ / [nh]r	yallumu katipa zabūli Yammi, bêna yadêma ṯāpiṭi Nahari	It [the mace] struck the shoulder of Prince Yammu, between the arms of Ruler Naharu.

When the fight ends in a draw, Kothar makes a second mace for Baʿal. This mace too is instructed:

(21–22) hlm . qdq/[d] . zbl ym . bn . ʿnm . ṭpṭ . nhr	hulum qudquda zabūli Yammi, bêna ʿênêma ṯāpiṭi Nahari	“Strike! the head of Prince Yammu!, between the eyes of Ruler Naharu!”

The fight is then described thus:

(24–25) ylm . qdqd . zbl / [ym .] bn . ʿnm . ṭpṭ . nhr	yallumu qudquda zabūli Yammi, bêna ʿênêma ṯāpiṭi Nahari	It struck the head of Prince Yammu, between the eyes of Ruler Naharu.

This time Baʿal indeed succeeds in killing Yammu.

In the quoted section several parallelisms may be noted: “shoulder” // “between the arms”; “head” // “between the eyes”; “Prince” // “Ruler”; and Yammu // Naharu.

An example of a chiasm is (Danʾil curses vultures after he has found out that they have scavenged the body of his dead son Aqhat; KTU^{2} 1.19 col. III, lines 42-44):

(42) knp . nšrm (43) bʿl . yṯbr	kanapē našrīma Baʿlu yaṯbur	“The vultures’ wings may Baʿal break,
bʿl . yṯbr . dʾiy (44) hmt	Baʿlu yaṯbur diʾya humutu	may Baʿal break their flying!”

The use of stereotyped epithets is very common in Ugaritic myths. For example, El is regularly called “the Compassionate” (laṭīpānu ʾIlu) or “the Bull” (ṯôru ʾIlu), Baal is routinely called “Most Powerful” (Baʿlu ʾalʾiyānu), “Rider of the Clouds” (rākibu ʿurpāti), or “Prince Baal” (Zabūlu Baʿlu), Sea too is called “Prince” (Zabūlu Yammu), and Asherah usually is “Asherah of the Sea” (ʾAṯiratu Yammi) or “Creatress [i.e., Mother] of the gods” (qāniyatu ʾilīma).

The epithet of a young prince, Athtar “the Terrible”, “the Awesome” (ʿAṯtaru ʿarrīẓu), may be a joke, for when he is made king and is put on Baal’s throne, his feet do not reach the ground, and his kingship is ended abruptly.

‘Numerical stairs’ or ‘progressions of numbers’ are of the form “N (times) X, N+1 (times) Y”, or “100 (times) X, 1000 (times) Y”. An example, where the huge size of Kirta’s army is portrayed (KTU^{2} 1.14, col. II, lines 39–42):

(39) hlk . l ʾalpm . ḫḏḏ	halakū le-ʾalpīma ḪḎḎ	They will go in thousands, a downpour (?),
(40) w l rbt . km . yr	wa-le-ribabāti kama YR	and in ten thousands, like the early rain (?);
(41) ʾaṯr . ṯn . ṯn . hlk	ʾaṯra ṯinê ṯinā halakū	two by two they will go,
(42) ʾaṯr . ṯlṯ . klhm	ʾaṯra ṯalāṯi kullūhumū	[three] by three, all together.

== Sample Texts ==
=== Baal wants a palace ===
Here is a fragment from the epic “Baal” cycle (KTU tablet 1.4 column 5). Baʿal, son of Supreme God El, has rebelled, he wants a palace of his own. After some blackmail – Baʿal withholds his rain from the land – El agrees. Baʿal's sister Anat brings him the good news:

Ugaritic (Note: Ugaritic text does not include many vowels which would have been present in spoken language)	vocalized	English
(25) ṣḥq . btlt . ʿnt . tšʾu	ṣaḥāqu batūl(a)tu ʿAnatu ; tiššaʾu	Maiden Anat laughed, she raised
(26) gh . w tṣḥ . tbšr bʿl	gâha wa-taṣīḥu : tabaššir Baʿlu ;	her voice and cried out: “Receive the good news, Baal!
(27) bšrtk . yblt . y[tn]	bašūr(a)tūka yabiltu ; yû[tanu]	Good news for you I bring; there will be gi[ven]
(28) bt . lk . km . ʾaḫk . w ḥẓr	bêtu lêka kamā ʾaḫḫîka , wa-ḥaẓiru	to you a house like your brothers, and a court
(29) km . ʾaryk . ṣḥ . ḫrn	kamā ʾaryika . ṣiḥ ḫarrāna	like your clansmen. Call a caravan (or wooden planks?)
(30) b bhtk . ʿḏbt . b qrb	bi bahatīka , ʿḎBT(?) bi qirbi	into your houses, supplies(?) into
(31) hklk . tblk . ġrm	hēkalika ; tabilūka ġūrūma	your palace; the mountains will bring you
(32) mʾid . ksp . gbʿm . mḥmd	maʾda kaspa , gab(a)ʿūma maḥmada	much silver, the hills [will bring] desirable
(33) ḫrṣ . w bn . bht . ksp	ḫurāṣa , wa-banā bahātī kaspi	gold, and build houses of silver
(34) w ḫrṣ . bht . ṭhrm	wa-ḫurāṣi , bahātī ṭuḥūrīma	and gold, houses of pure
(35) ʾiqnʾim	ʾiqnʾīma [...]	lapis lazuli.”

=== Anat’s Love ===
Next, two poetic fragments. In the first Anat’s love for her brother Baal is described (KTU^{2} 1.6, col. II, lines 6-9 = 28-30):

(6) tngṯh	tanguṯuhu;	She approached him;
k lb . ʾarḫ (7) l ʿglh .	ka libbi ʾarḫi lê ʿigliha,	like the heart of a cow for her calf,
k . lb . ṯʾat (8) l ʾimrh .	ka libbi ṯaʾti lê ʾimmiriha,	like the heart of a ewe for her lamb,
km . lb . ʿnt (9) ʾaṯr . bʿl	kāma libbu ʿAnati ʾaṯra Baʿli.	such (was) the heart of Anat towards Baal.

=== Baal’s power ===
In the next fragment (KTU^{2} 1.3, col. III) Baal boasts to Anat of his powers (the fragment is reminiscent of the Biblical book of Job, chapter 38):

(20) rgm (21) ʾiṯ . ly .	rigmu ʾiṯu layya,	“I have something to say (lit.: A word there is for me),
w . ʾargmk (22) hwt .	wa ʾargumakki huwāta,	and I will tell you a message;
w . ʾaṯnyk . rgm	wa ʾaṯniyakki rigma	namely, I will recount to you the word
(23) ʿṣ . w . lḫšt . ʾabn	ʿiṣi wa laḫašta ʾabni,	of the tree and the whisper of the stone,
(24) tʾant . šmm . ʿm . ʾarṣ	taʾanata šamîma ʿimma ʾarṣi,	the murmur of the heavens towards the earth,
(25) thmt . ʿmn . kbkbm	tahāmati ʿimmānu kabkabīma.	of the deep sea towards the stars.
(26) ʾabn . brq . d l . tdʿ . šmm	ʾabīnu baraqa dā lā tidaʿū šamûma,	I understand the lightning that the heavens do not know,
(27) rgm . l tdʿ . nšm .	rigma lā tidaʿū našūma,	a word (that) people do not know,
w . l tbn (28) hmlt . ʾarṣ .	wa lā tabīnu hamullatu ʾarṣi.	and (that) the masses of the earth do not understand.
ʾatm . w ʾank (29) ʾibġyh .	ʾatîma, wa ʾanāku ʾibġayuhu,	Come, and then I myself will reveal it,
b tk . ġry . ʾil . ṣpn	bi tôki ġūriya ʾili Ṣapuni,	in the midst of my mountain, divine Zaphon,
(30) b qdš . b ġr . nḥlty	bi qudši bi ġūri naḥlatiya,	in the sanctuary in the mountain of my inheritance,
(31) b nʿm . b gbʿ . tlʾiyt	bi naʿimi, bi gabʿi talʾiyati.	in the pleasant place, in the hill of my victory.”

=== A “redemption” ===
An official document, bearing the seal of king Niqmaddu (III), states the conditions of a so-called ‘redemptionʼ (KTU^{2} 3.4):

(1) l . ym hnd (2) ʾiwrkl . pdy	lê yômi hānādū ʾIwrikallu padaya	“From this day Iwrikallu has ‘redeemedʼ (paid ransom for the release of)
(3) ʾagdn . bn . nwgn	ʾAgdena bina NWGN-i,	Agdenu the son of NWGN,
(4) w ynḥm . ʾaḫh	wa Yanḥama ʾaḫahu,	and Yanḥamu his brother,
(5) w . bʿln ʾaḫh	wa Baʿalāna ʾaḫahu,	and Baʿlānu his brother,
(6) w . ḥtṯn . bnh	wa Ḥattuṯāna binahu,	and Ḥattuṯānu his son,
(7) w . btšy . bth	wa BTŠY-a bittahu,	and BTŠY his daughter,
(8) w . ʾištrmy (9) bt . ʿbdmlk ʾaṯt[h]	wa Ištarʾummīya bitta ʿAbdumalki ʾaṯṯatahu,	and Ištarʾummīyu, daughter of Abdumalki, his wife,
(10) w snt (11) bt ʾugrt	wa SNT-a bitta ʾUgarīti;	and SNT, “daughter” (inhabitant) of Ugarit;
(12) w . pdy . h[m] (13) ʾiwrkl . mʾit (14) ksp .	wa padayahumū ʾIwrikallu miʾita kaspa	to wit, Iwrikallu has ‘redeemedʼ (paid) for them 100 (shekels of) silver
b yd (15) bʾirtym	bi yadê Biʾirātiyyīma;	to (lit.: in the hands of) the Beirutians;
(16) [w ʾu]nṯ inn (17) lhm	wa ʾunuṯṯu ênuna lêhumū	and there will be no ʾunuṯṯu [a tax?] obligation for them
ʿd tṯṯbn (18) ksp . ʾiwrkl	ʿadê taṯaṯibūna kaspa ʾIwrikalli	until they have paid back (lit.: returned) the silver to Iwrikallu;
(19) w . ṯb . l ʾunṯhm	wa ṯābū lê ʾunuṯṯīhumū.	and [only then] they will return to (again pay) their ʾunuṯṯu obligations.”

=== Manumission of a slave ===
The same king also features as the (nominal) author of correspondence and documents, for example in a legal document confirming the manumission of a royal slave (KTU^{2} 2.19; the beginning of the text, presumably bearing Niqmaddu’s seal, has broken off):

(1) [...] l . yʾiḫd ṣṭqšlm (2) b ʾunṯ .	[...] lā yiʾḫadū Ṣiṭqušalima bi ʾunuṯṯi.	“[...] not will they (or: he, the king?) seize Ṣidqušalimu into ʾunuṯṯu service.
km . špš (3) d brt .	kama Šapši dī barrat,	Like the Sun who is free (lit.: pure),
kmt (4) br . ṣṭqšlm (5) b ʾunṯ . ʿd ʿlm	kamata barra Ṣiṭqušalimu bi ʾunuṯṯi ʿad ʿālami.	just so Ṣidqušalimu will be free from ʾunuṯṯu service forever.
(6) mʾišmn . nqmd (7) mlk ʾugrt	—maʾšamānu Niqmaddi malki ʾUgarīti.—	—Seal of Niqmaddu, king of Ugarit.—
(8) nqmd . mlk . ʾugrt (9) ktb .	Niqmaddu malku ʾUgarīti kataba	Niqmaddu, king of Ugarit has written
spr hnd (10) d tbrrt . ṣṭqšlm	sipra hannadā dā tabrīrata Ṣiṭqušalimi	this document of the manumission of Ṣidqušalimu,
(11) ʿbdh . hnd	ʿabdihu hannadī.	this (former) slave of his.
(12) w mnkm . l yqḥ (13) spr . mlk . hnd	wa mannakama lā yiqqaḥa sipra malki hannadā	And no one will take away this document of the king
(14) b yd . ṣṭqšlm (15) ʿd ʿlm	bi yadê Ṣiṭqušalimi ʿad ʿālami.	from the hands of Ṣidqušalimu, (for)ever!”

=== Ritual wine deliveries ===
From a list describing the organization of wine deliveries for royal ritual celebrations (KTU^{2} 1.91):

(1) yn . d . ykl . bd . r[...]	yênu dū yikkalû bîdê R[...]	Wine that is to be delivered (or: consumed) in the hands of R[...]
(2) b . dbḥ . mlk – [...]	bi dabaḥī malki – [...]	during the sacrificial rites of the king – [...]:
There follows a list of 18 festivals where sacrifices have to be performed, among them:
(3) dbḥ ṣpn	dabḥu Ṣapuni;	a sacrifice for [the gods of Mount] Ṣapunu;
(4) tzġm	tazuġġūma;	the «tazuġġu» sacrifices;
(5) ʾilʾib	ʾIluʾibî;	[the sacrifices] for (ancestral deity) ʾIluʾibî;
(6) ʾil bldn	ʾilū bildāni;	[the sacrifices] for (the gods of) the country;
(10) k . tʿrb . ʿṯtrt . šd . bt . mlk	kī tiʿrabu ʿAṯtartu-Šadî bêta malki;	[the sacrifices for] when ʿAṯtartu-of-the-Fields enters the palace of the king;
(11) k . tʿrbn . ršpm . bt . mlk	kī tiʿrabūna Rašapūma bêta malki;	[the sacrifices for] when the Rašapūma enter the palace of the king; [...]
Next follows a list of the quota of wine that each of 14 villages has to deliver:
(21) lbnm – [.] ʿšr . yn	Labnuma: ʿašru yênu;	Labnuma: ten [kaddu measures of] wine;
(22) ḫlb . gngnt . ṯlṯ . y[n]	Ḫalbu-Ganganati: ṯalāṯu yê[nu];	Aleppo-Ganganati: three [kaddu measures of] wi[ne]; [...]
Finally the grand total:
(35) tgmr . yn . mṣb . š[...]	— tagmaru yêni MṢB: ša[bʿūma ʾarbaʿu kubda],	— Total of ‘ordinary’ wine: se[venty-four] [kaddu measures] (ca. 800 liters),
(36) w . ḥs[p .] ṯn . kbd[...]	wa ḤS[P] ṯinâ kubda [...].	and of decanted (i.e., ‘quality’) [wine]: two and ... (number of tens missing) [kaddu measures].

== See also ==
- Ugarit
- Ugaritic alphabet
- Northwest Semitic languages
- Central Semitic languages
- Semitic Languages
- Proto-Semitic language
