= Tale of Aqhat =

Canaanite myth from Ugarit

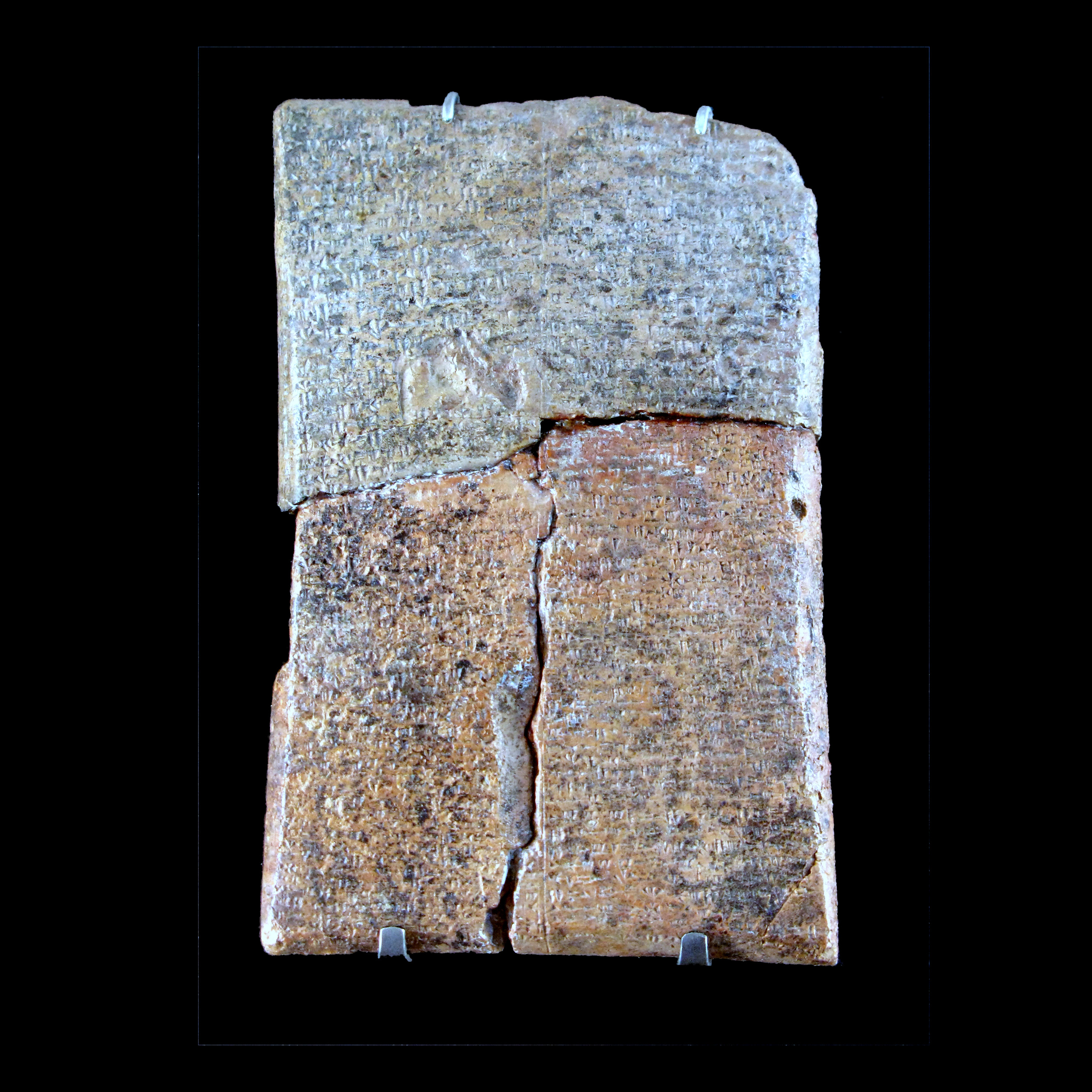
Tablet containing the Tale of Aqhat

The Tale of Aqhat or Epic of Aqhat is a Canaanite myth from Ugarit, an ancient city in what is now Syria. It was written and preserved in the Ugaritic language It is one of the three longest texts to have been found at Ugarit, the other two being the Legend of Keret and the Baal Cycle. It dates to approximately 1350 BCE.

While the complete tale has not been preserved, there remain of it, according to David Wright, "approximately 650 poetic lines", with the bulk of its content concerning "ritual performances or their contexts". The remains of the story are found on three clay tablets, missing the beginning and end of the story. These tablets were discovered in 1930 and 1931.

The Tale of Aqhat was recorded at Ugarit by the high priest Ilmilku, who was also the author of the Legend of Keret and the Baal Cycle. The three primary characters of the Tale are a man named Danel, his son Aqhat, and his daughter Pugat.

== The narrative ==
=== First tablet ===
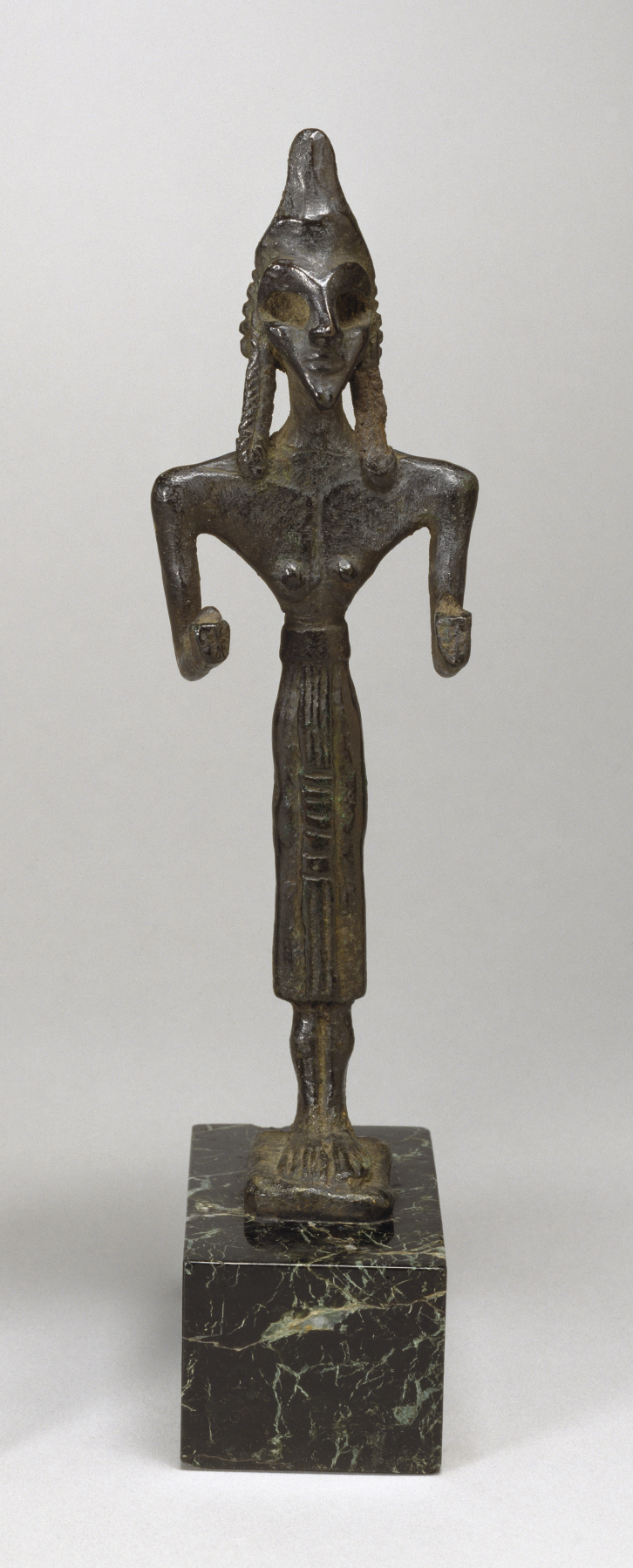
Votive figurine of the goddess Anat

Danel is described as a "righteous ruler" (Davies) or "probably a king" (Curtis), providing justice to widows and orphans. Danel begins the story without a son, although missing material from the beginning of the story makes it unclear whether Danel has lost children, or whether he simply has not had a son yet. On six successive days, Danel makes offerings at a temple, requesting a son. On the seventh, the god Baal asks the high god El to provide Danel a son, to which El agrees.

Danel's prayers to the gods are answered with the birth of Aqhat. The grateful Danel holds a feast to which he invited the Kotharat, female divinities associated with childbearing.

A gap appears in the text. After it, Danel is given a bow by the god Kothar-wa-Khasis, who is grateful to Danel for providing him hospitality. According to Fontenrose, the bow is given to Danel when Aqhat is still an "infant", while as Wright reads the tale after Aqhat has "grown up".

After a missing portion of text, the story resumes as Aqhat, described by Louden as "now a young man", is celebrating a feast at which various deities are in attendance.

Aqhat, who now has the bow, is offered a reward by the goddess Anat if he will give it to her. Anat offers Aqhat first gold and silver, but he refuses. She then offers him immortality, but he refuses again. As she makes her offers, she uses language that likely implies an offer of a sexual nature as well. His refusal is disrespectful: he tells her to go get a bow of her own from Kothar-wa-Hasis, and says that women have no business with such weapons. He insists that immortality is impossible: all humans must die. Anat, outraged, leaves to speak to the high god El.

=== Second tablet ===
Anat complains to El, according to Wright "apparently to receive his permission to punish Aqhat". El's initial response, if he gives one, is not readable due to the damaged nature of the tablet, but Anat's tone turns from an initial one of respect to violent threats against El. Reluctantly, El grants Anat leave to do as she wishes.

Anat then has Aqhat killed. The character who personally kills Aqhat is Yatpan, described by Vrezen and van der Woude as "one of Anat's warriors", but by Pitard simply as "one of her devotees". Yatpan, magically transformed into an eagle, attacks Aqhat.

=== Third tablet ===
Aqhat dies, and Anat eulogizes him, expressing regret for his death. Although the text at this point is fragmentary, it indicates that his bow has been broken in the incident, and Anat expresses her anguish over the loss of the bow as well, in even stronger terms. She also laments that, due to the murder, crops will soon begin to fail.

Meanwhile, Danel, who does not realize his son is dead, continues going about his judicial duties in the city gate. His daughter Paghat notices that a drought has begun, and that birds of prey are circling their home. She feels deep sadness.

At this point the text contains language about Danel's clothes being torn, indicating either that Paghat has torn Danel's clothing or that Danel has torn his own clothing in mourning over the drought. The text has Danel praying for rain, followed by several lines about a drought lasting seven years, which are difficult to interpret. Danel goes out to the fields, expressing his wishes for the crops to grow and expressing hope that his son Aqhat will harvest them, indicating that he does not yet realize Aqhat has died.

At this point, two young men appear and inform Danel and Paghat that Aqhat has been killed by Anat. Seeing vultures overhead Danel calls out to Baal, asking him to bring down the vultures so that he can cut them open to search for his son's remains. Baal complies, but Danel finds no remains. Danel sees the father of the vultures, and again has Baal bring the father of the vultures down for inspection. Again, no remains are found. Finally, Danel calls upon Baal to bring down the mother of the vultures, in which he finds bone and fat from Aqhat. Danel buries the remains he has found along the shores of the Kinneret (Sea of Galilee).

The unjust death of Aqhat causes a years-long drought to occur.

Aqhat's sister Paghat takes it upon herself to seek revenge by killing Yatpan.

== Bibliography ==
- Ackerman, Susan (2005). When Heroes Love: The Ambiguity of Eros in the Stories of Gilgamesh and David. Columbia University Press. ISBN 978-0-231-50725-7.
- Arnold, Bill T.; Beyer, Bryan E. (2002). Readings from the Ancient Near East: Primary Sources for Old Testament Study. Baker Academic. ISBN 978-0-8010-2292-0.
- Bach, Alice (2013). Women in the Hebrew Bible: A Reader. Routledge. ISBN 978-1-135-23868-1.
- Bienkowski, Piotr (2010). "Aqhat". In Piotr Bienkowski; Alan Millard (eds.). Dictionary of the Ancient Near East. University of Pennsylvania Press. ISBN 978-0-8122-2115-2.
- Coogan, Michael David (1978). Stories from Ancient Canaan. Westminster John Knox Press. ISBN 978-0-664-24184-1.
- Curtis, A. H. W. (2011). "Canaanite Gods and Religion". In Bill T. Arnold; H. G. M. Williamson (eds.). Dictionary of the Old Testament: Historical Books. InterVarsity Press. ISBN 978-0-8308-6946-6.
- Davies, Philip R. (1985). Daniel. A&C Black. ISBN 978-1-85075-002-4.
- Day, Peggy Lynne (1989). Gender and Difference in Ancient Israel. Fortress Press. ISBN 978-1-4514-1576-6.
- de Moor, Johannes C. (1987). An Anthology of Religious Texts from Ugarit. Brill Archive. ISBN 90-04-08330-8.
- Fant, Clyde E.; Reddish, Mitchell G. (2008). Lost Treasures of the Bible: Understanding the Bible Through Archaeological Artifacts in World Museums. Eerdmans. ISBN 978-0-8028-2881-1.
- Fontenrose, Joseph Eddy (1974). Python: A Study of Delphic Myth and Its Origins. Biblo & Tannen Publishers. ISBN 978-0-8196-0285-5.
- Fontenrose, Joseph Eddy (1981). Orion: The Myth of the Hunter and the Huntress. University of California Press. p. 217. ISBN 978-0-520-09632-5.
- Gibson, John C. (1978). Canaanite Myths and Legends. A&C Black. ISBN 978-0-567-08089-9.
- Louden, Bruce (2006). The Iliad: Structure, Myth, and Meaning. JHU Press. p. 262. ISBN 978-0-8018-8280-7.
- Margalit, Baruch (2011). The Ugaritic Poem of AQHT: Text, Translation, Commentary. Walter de Gruyter. ISBN 978-3-11-086348-2.
- Pitard, Wayne T. (2001) [1998]. "Before Israel". In Michael David Coogan (ed.). The Oxford History of the Biblical World. Oxford University Press. ISBN 978-0-19-513937-2.
- Pritchard, James B.; Fleming, Daniel E. (2011). The Ancient Near East: An Anthology of Texts and Pictures. Princeton University Press. ISBN 978-0-691-14726-0.
- Pritchard, James B. (30 March 2016). Ancient Near Eastern Texts Relating to the Old Testament with Supplement. Princeton University Press. ISBN 978-1-4008-8276-2.
- Sapir, Yitshaq (19 November 2015). "Aqhat". In Eric Orlin (ed.). Routledge Encyclopedia of Ancient Mediterranean Religions. Routledge. ISBN 978-1-134-62552-9.
- Smith, Mark S. (2014). Poetic Heroes: The Literary Commemorations of Warriors and Warrior Culture in the Early Biblical World. Eerdmans. ISBN 978-0-8028-6792-6.
- Wright, David P. (2001). Ritual in Narrative: The Dynamics of Feasting, Mourning, and Retaliation in the Ugaritic Tale of Aqhat.
- Wyatt, Nicolas (1999). "The Story of Aqhat". In Wilfred G. E. Watson; Nicolas Wyatt (eds.). Handbook of Ugaritic Studies. BRILL. ISBN 90-04-10988-9.
- Wyatt, Nicolas (2007). "Religion in Ancient Ugarit". In John R. Hinnells (ed.). A Handbook of Ancient Religions. Cambridge University Press. ISBN 978-1-139-46198-6.
- Vriezen, T.C.; van der Woude, A. S. (2005). Ancient Israelite And Early Jewish Literature. Translated by Brian Doyle. BRILL. ISBN 90-04-12427-6.
