= Temple of Aphlad =

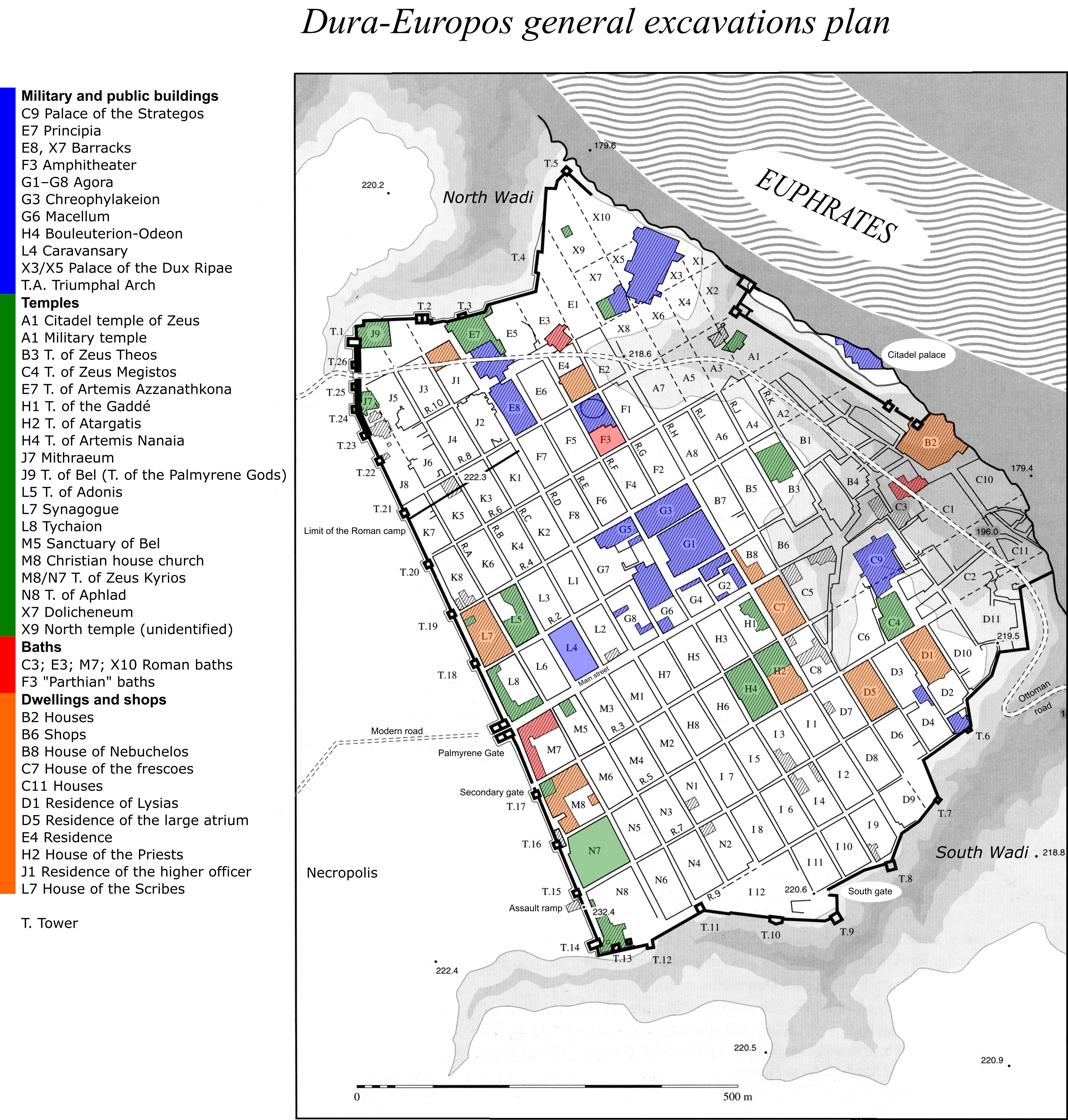
Plan of Dura-Europos, Temple of Aphlad marked as N8

The Temple of Aphlad was an ancient temple located in the southwestern corner of Dura Europos, and dedicated to the god Aphlad (also called Apalados or Aphalados in Greek). Aphlad was originally a Semitic Mesopotamian god from the city of Anath, and presence of his cult in Dura is revealing of its religious and cultural diversity. The temple itself consists of an open courtyard with multiple scattered rooms and altars, similar to the Temple of Bel, which was located in an analogous position in the northwestern corner of Dura.

== Discovery ==
The temple was discovered by a Yale team in 1931, during the fifth season of excavations at Dura. Dura is located in present-day Syria, which, at the time of this excavation, was under French colonial rule.

== The Temple ==
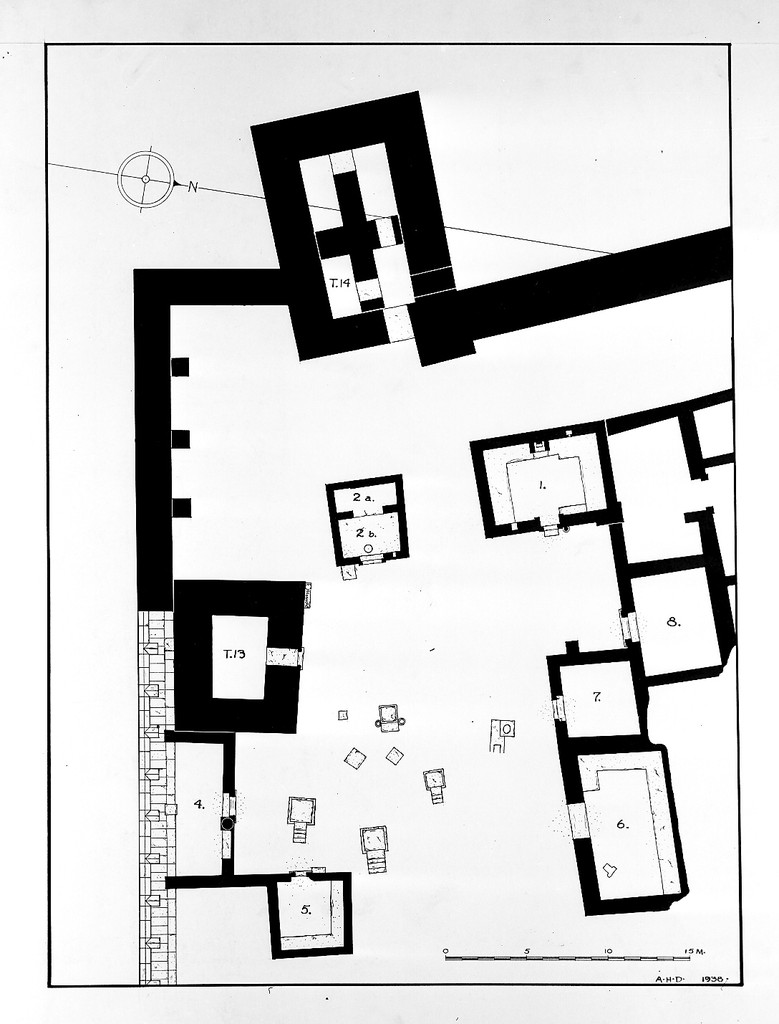
Temple of Aphlad, Period II, plan by Detweiler

The temple itself was a large, open air space, measuring 38 metres by 34 metres. The temple is nestled in the southwest corner of Dura, with the city wall forming its walls. Within the courtyard are eight rooms--nine if tower 14 is counted--and eight scattered altars. Just as in the Temple of Bel, there is no residual evidence of fire on the altars, so they were probably used just for incense and libations. The general building plan of a courtyard with rooms inside is typical of Durene temples, but the irregularity of their placement in the Temple of Aphlad is unusual. Susan Downey noted that the temple is also odd because it lacks a temenos wall. Another unique feature is the incorporation of towers into religious space. It is unknown whether tower 14 was a part of the sanctuary, but another, heavier tower, was built inside the wall in the Roman period, with its door opening directly into the courtyard. Von Gerkan proposed a theory that the temples of Bel and Aphlad "were placed so as to put the two most vulnerable corners of the city wall under divine protection." A few of the altars, as well as the two holiest rooms, faced east. One of these is the sanctuary of Aphlad (room 1); the other room was divided in into two (rooms 2a and 2b), a forecourt (pronaos; 2b) and sanctuary proper (naos, 2a). The interior of this room was decorated with frescoes. A bowl was built into the floor at the doorway of room 2b, which could be used for ritual purifications. The sanctuary of Aphlad "had benches on three sides, an altar with an incense dish, and, on one of the walls, a somewhat basic painting of a cult-scene depicting a large bird on an altar." Greek graffiti was found on its walls. A block with an inscription was found face down in the sanctuary, placed beside the cult relief, with an inscription reading:

54 A.D. The twentieth day of Gorpiaios. The undersigned members of the association, [their names], erected this andron to the god Aphlad, on behalf of the safety of the general Seleucos, of themselves and of their children.

This inscription is not only revelatory because it gives an exact date for the construction of the sanctuary, but because the names listed answer some questions as to who Aphlad's devotees were. It lists the names of the nine members of Aphlad's cult who dedicated this sanctuary, including Adadiabos, dedicant of the cult stele. These nine men came from three families, and all but one had Semitic names (his was a Greek translation of a Semitic name.) This, and the fact that none of the family names appeared in Dura before 54 A.D, suggests that Aphlad's devotees may have been migratory merchants originating in Anath. This is supported by the inscription on the cult relief, which may categorize the sanctuary as a branch of the Anath cult, established outside of Aphlad's ritual center of Anath.

Before the siege of Dura Europos, many of its temples were "deliberately desanctified, and a number of them including the mithraeum, the synagogue, the temple of Aphlad, and the Christian building, were all partially destroyed and sealed beneath the rampart. As part of this process, cult reliefs like that of Aphlad were put out of use by turning them around to face the wall before being sealed beneath the earth. This careful closing of the sanctuary may have been meant as a temporary measure. Aphlad’s worshippers, though, would never return to their andron in which this cult relief had been dedicated in the first century."

== The Relief ==
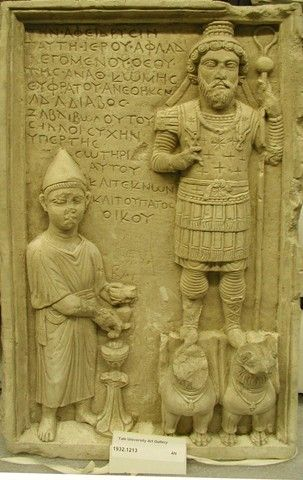
Cult Stele to the God Aphlad

The most important and revealing artifact found in the Temple is a limestone stele dedicated to Aphlad. It is a rectangular relief standing about 51cm tall and 32cm wide, with a depth of about 9cm. It depicts Aphlad in military garb standing atop two griffins with a scepter in hand. Beside him a priest offers incense atop an altar. Also on the stele is a Greek inscription reading:

This foundation of the sanctuary of Aphlad, called god of the village of Anath on the Euphrates, Adadiabos, son of Zabdibolos, son of Silloi erected as his vow on behalf of the salvation of himself, his children, and all of his house.

Aphlad's dress is representative of the syncretic culture of Dura at the time. He is a Semitic god, but is depicted in a decidedly Parthian style. Many elements of his dress, such as his belt and diadem, are distinctly Parthian, while other elements, such as his cuirass, are Hellenistic.Hopkins also suggests that there is some Roman influence in his dress. Aphlad wears both a diadem and polos, not seen in other Durene and Parthian depictions of gods and kings, and otherwise only seen in a few Palmyrene reliefs from the era. Aphlad's depiction on this relief has many similarities with Parthian and other Persian depictions of sun gods. This, and the fact that the Semitic goddess Azzanathkona was knows to be worshipped by Durene Greeks as Artemis, suggests that Aphlad may have been a sun god, and possibly even represented Apollo to Durene Greeks, but this is highly speculative.

It is also quite unique among Durene sculpture in its style and medium. Full frontality of figures is a trademark of Durene art, but the priest beside Aphlad stands turned slightly to the side. Disproportionately large heads, as seen in this relief, are not found in other Durene artworks, and is a feature associated with earlier Mesopotamian art. The crispness and level of detail found in this relief is unusual among recovered Durene sculpture. Part of this is due to the material; it is made from limestone harder and finer than the coarse, local limestone or Palmyrene limestone used in most Durene sculpture. The stone probably came from the area of Anath. Although this is the area in which Aphlad was originally worshipped, it is believed that the relief was sculpted in Dura. Another relief found in the Temple of Zeus Kyrios, dated to 31AD, was found to be made from the same Anath limestone, in addition to sharing many distinctive stylistic features with the Aphlad relief, such as the use of perspective and lack of full frontality. Susan Downey suggests that these two steles were probably not by the same artist, but may have been produced by the same workshop.

The relief was discovered by Clark Hopkins in 1931 in the Sanctuary of Aphlad (Room 1). The relief was found face down, buried under rubble, across the room from the niche where it originally stood. It was removed from its niche as part of the desanctification of some religious spaces before the siege of Dura. However, the fact that the relief was buried with care suggests that Aphlad's devotees saw the interment of their sanctuary as a temporary measure.
