= Calathus =

Calathus may refer to:

- Calathus (basket), a Greco-Roman basket or vase
- Calath (crown), Scythian crown high tall flat-topped cylindrical headdress in the shape of Calathus (basket) found in ancient Scythian art and art of the Scythian world.
- Calathus (beetle), a genus of beetle
