= Calathus (basket) =

Basket used as a symbol in ancient Greek art

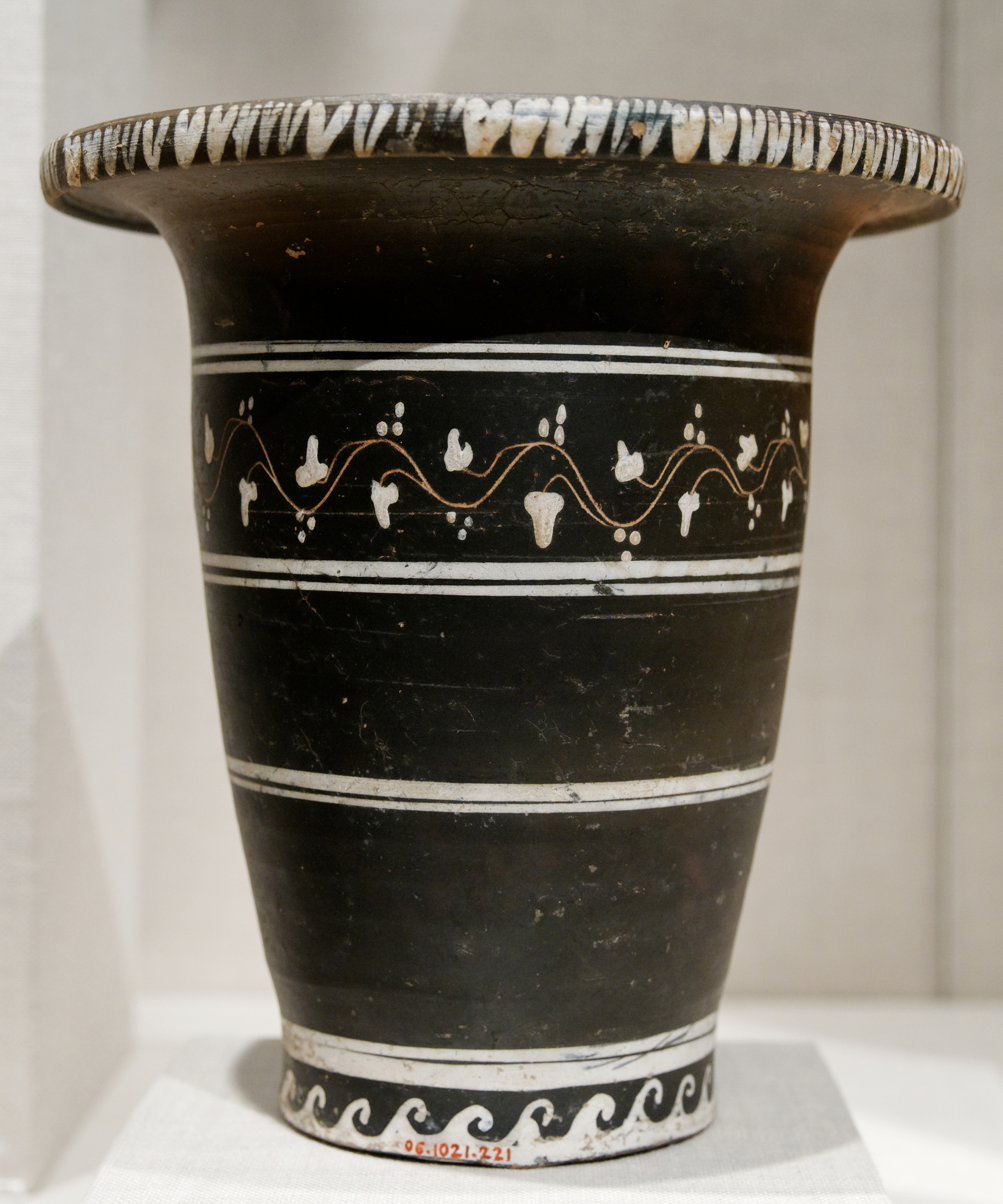
Apulian calathus in Gnathian style, circa 325–300 BC, Metropolitan Museum of Art

A calathus /ˈkæləθəs/ or kalathos /ˈkæləˌθɒs/ (Ancient Greek: κάλαθος, plural calathi or kalathoi κάλαθοι) was a basket resembling a top hat, used to hold wool or fruit, often used in ancient Greek art as a symbol of abundance and fertility. These baskets were made by weaving together reeds or twigs. They were typically used by women to store skeins of wool, but they had other uses in the household. In Roman times, there are reports for baskets of these sorts to be used in agricultural activities like bringing in the fruits from the fields.

The word was also used to describe ceramic vases designed in the shape of the calathus basket, which is the usual application in archaeology, since vases have survived while baskets have not.

== Description and function ==
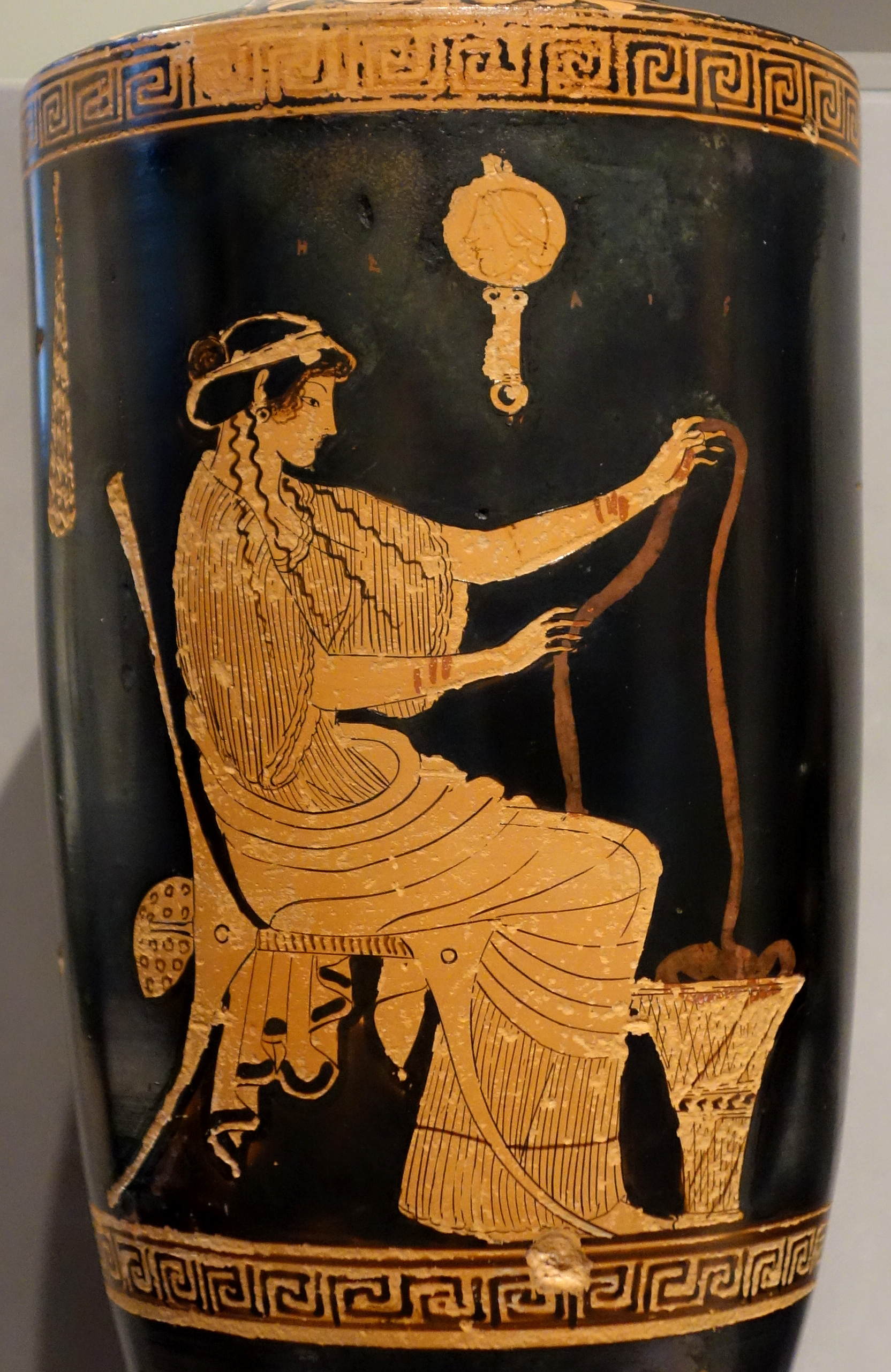
A woman working wool from a calathus. Athenian red-figure lekythos attributed to the Brygos Painter, c. 480–470 BC.

The calathus usually had a narrow base and a flared top. The decoration on some of the ceramic calathi is taken to imitate the woven texture of a basket. This can be achieved by a painted design, but many calathi have open-work cut into their sides and some have impressed decoration. Calathi may occur with or without handles. In both the Greek and Roman worlds these baskets had many uses, but were especially associated with wool working and the harvest.

The calathus is principally a multifunctional basket. Literary sources report that, depending on the context, the calathus could contain wool, but also food (bread, cheese, milk, fruits and vegetables), small animals or flowers. The calathi were most often made of willow rods, but other examples made from clay, metal, glass and stone are also known. A silver calathus with a golden rim is mentioned by Homer as belonging to Helen, this one even ran on wheels. Calathi are also depicted on Greek vases in other contexts. Illustrations on south-Italian vases make use of the calathus as a symbol of a future marital relationship.

== Iconography of deities ==
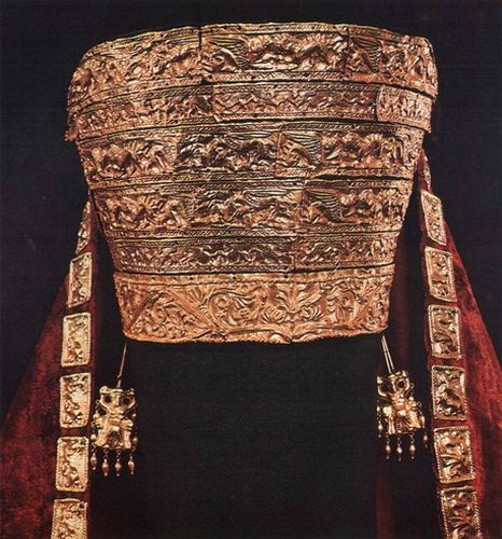
Scythian Calath crown high tall cylindrical headdress from the Tovsta Mohyla kurhan

The calathus is an iconographic attribute of certain Greek deities, such as Demeter and Dionysus; it sometimes appears in the form of a headdress, as with Serapis and Hecate. In Cyprus, a fragmentary figurine of a woman wearing a crown (polos in the shape of a calathus) has been identified as Aphrodite. Similar crowned limestone heads have been found all over the island. The calathus has traditionally been interpreted as a fertility symbol, reserved for goddesses or their priestesses.

== See also ==
- Cornucopia
