= Modius (headdress) =

Cylindrical Egyptian and Greco-Roman hat

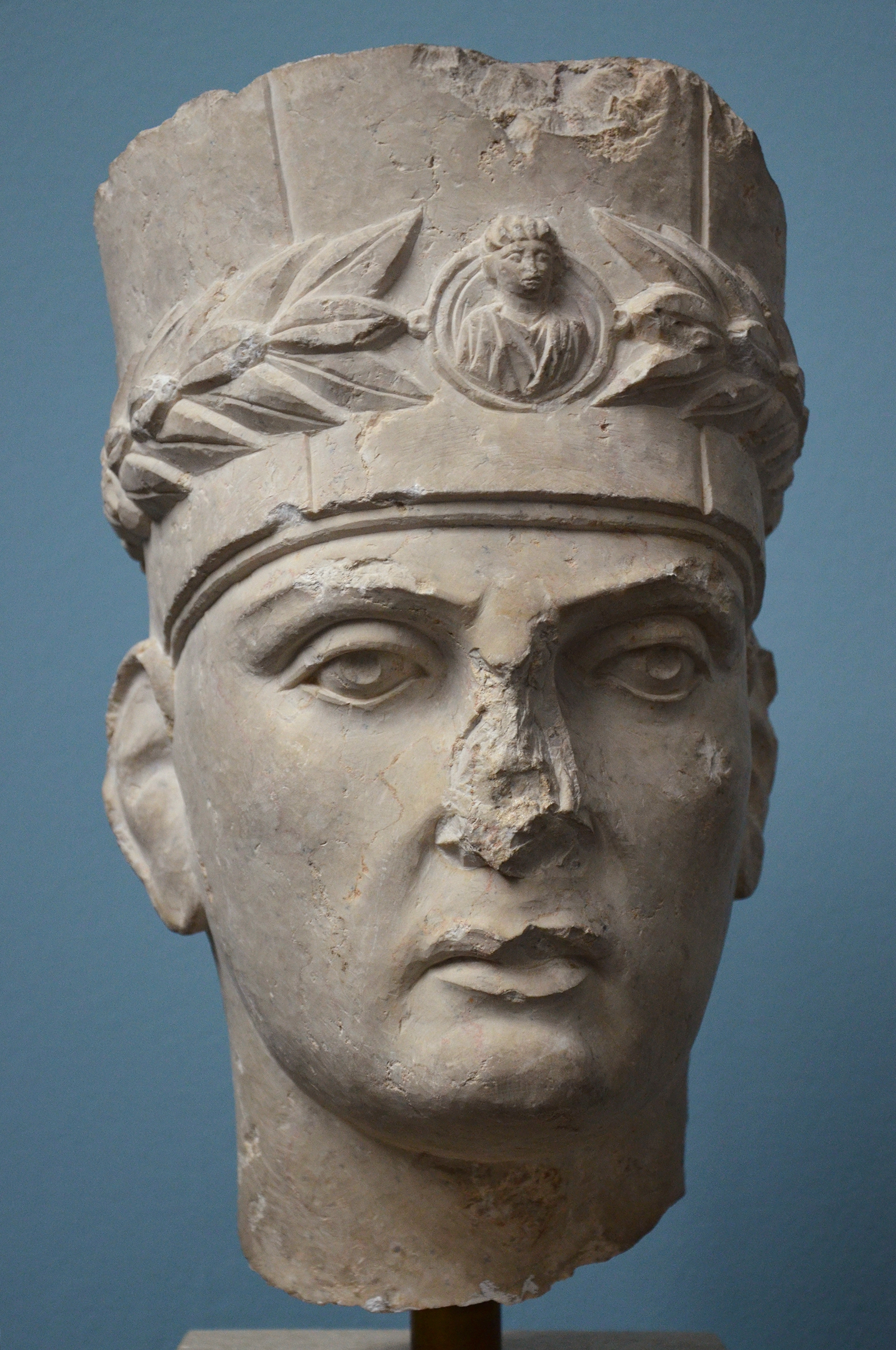
Palmyrene priest wearing the modius, AD 190–200 (Carlsberg Glyptotek)

The modius is a type of flat-topped cylindrical headdress or crown found in ancient Egyptian art and art of the Greco-Roman world. The name was given by modern scholars based on its resemblance to the jar used as a Roman unit of dry measure, but it probably does represent a grain-measure, symbolizing reason as weights and measures.

The modius is worn by certain deities, including the Eleusinian deities and their Roman counterparts, the Ephesian Artemis and certain other forms of the goddess, Hecate, and Serapis. Serapis was the main idol/figurehead at the Library of Alexandria during the ancient Egyptian & Roman alliance. Personifications of Genius often wore the modius. On some deities it represents fruitfulness.

== Appearance ==
It is thought to be a form mostly restricted to supernatural beings in art, and rarely worn in real life, with two probable exceptions. A tall modius is part of the complex headdress used for depictions of Egyptian royal women, often ornamented variously with symbols, vegetative motifs, and the uraeus. It was also the distinctive headdress of Palmyrene priests.

== Gallery ==
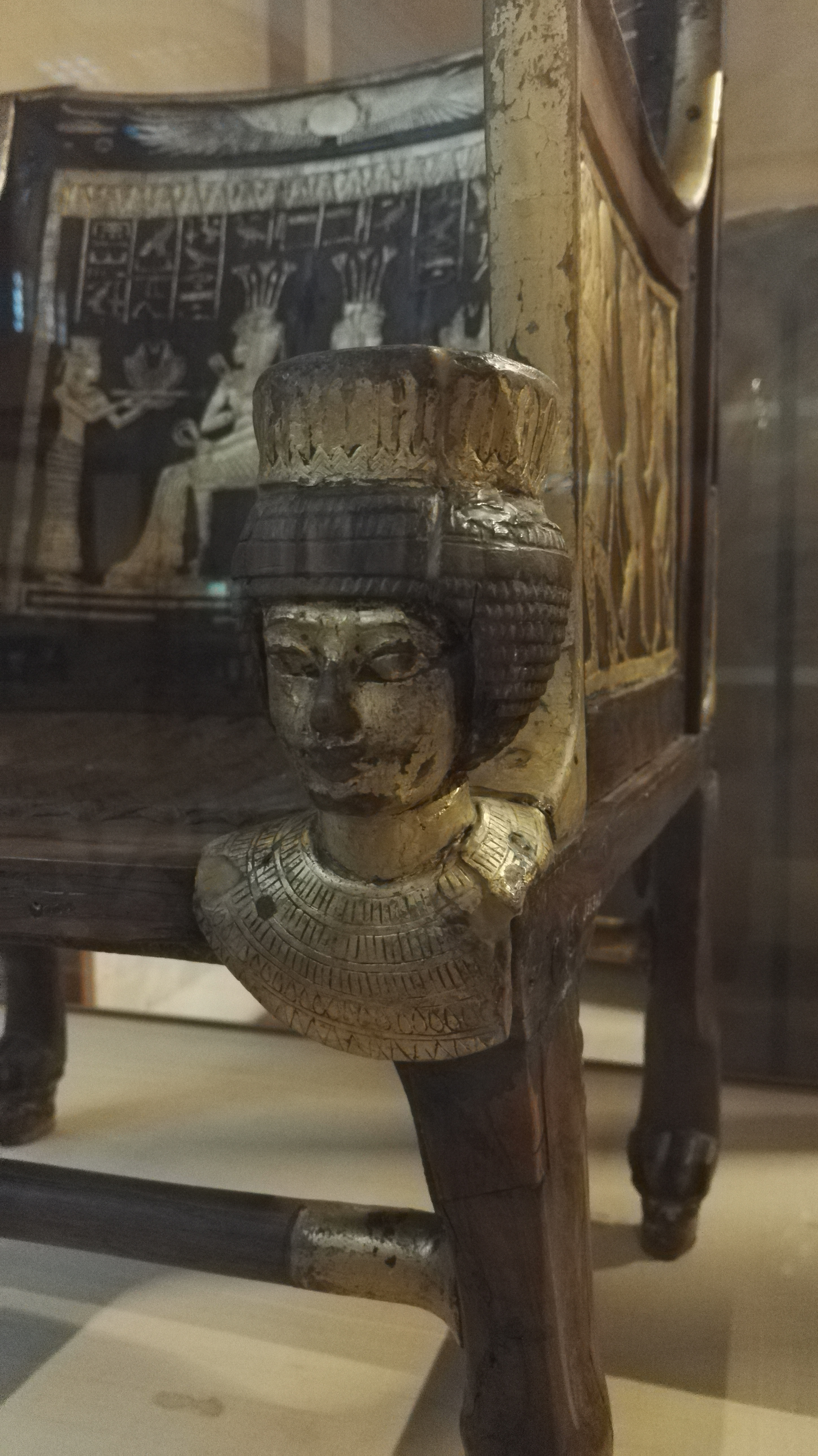
Sitamun, daughter of Amenhotep III, depicted wearing a modius on her throne. From the Tomb of Yuya and Thuya, 18th Dynasty

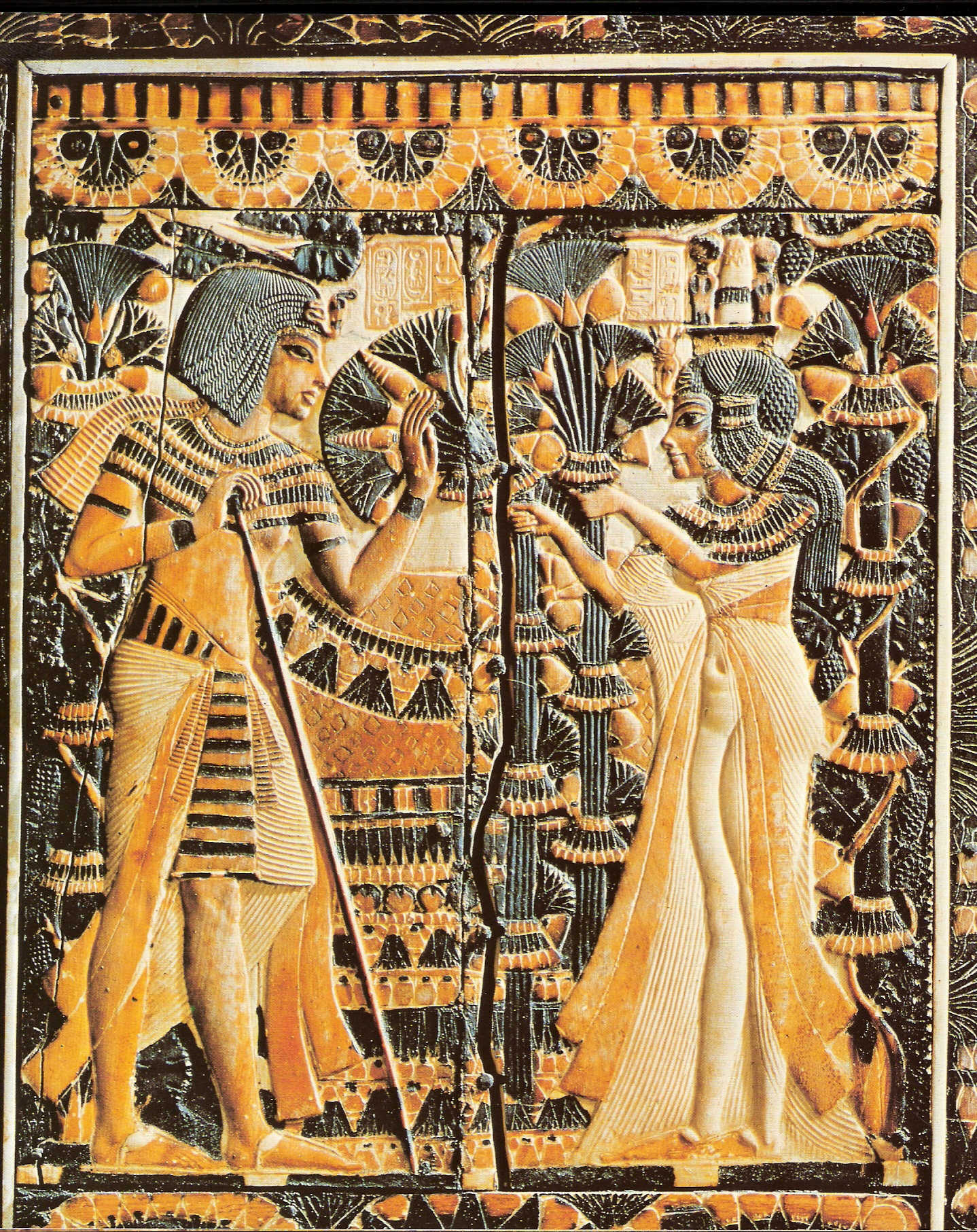
Ankhesenamun depicted on a box lid wearing a modius topped by a head cone and two uraei while presenting bouquets to her husband, Tutankhamun. Tomb of Tutankhamun, 18th Dynasty.

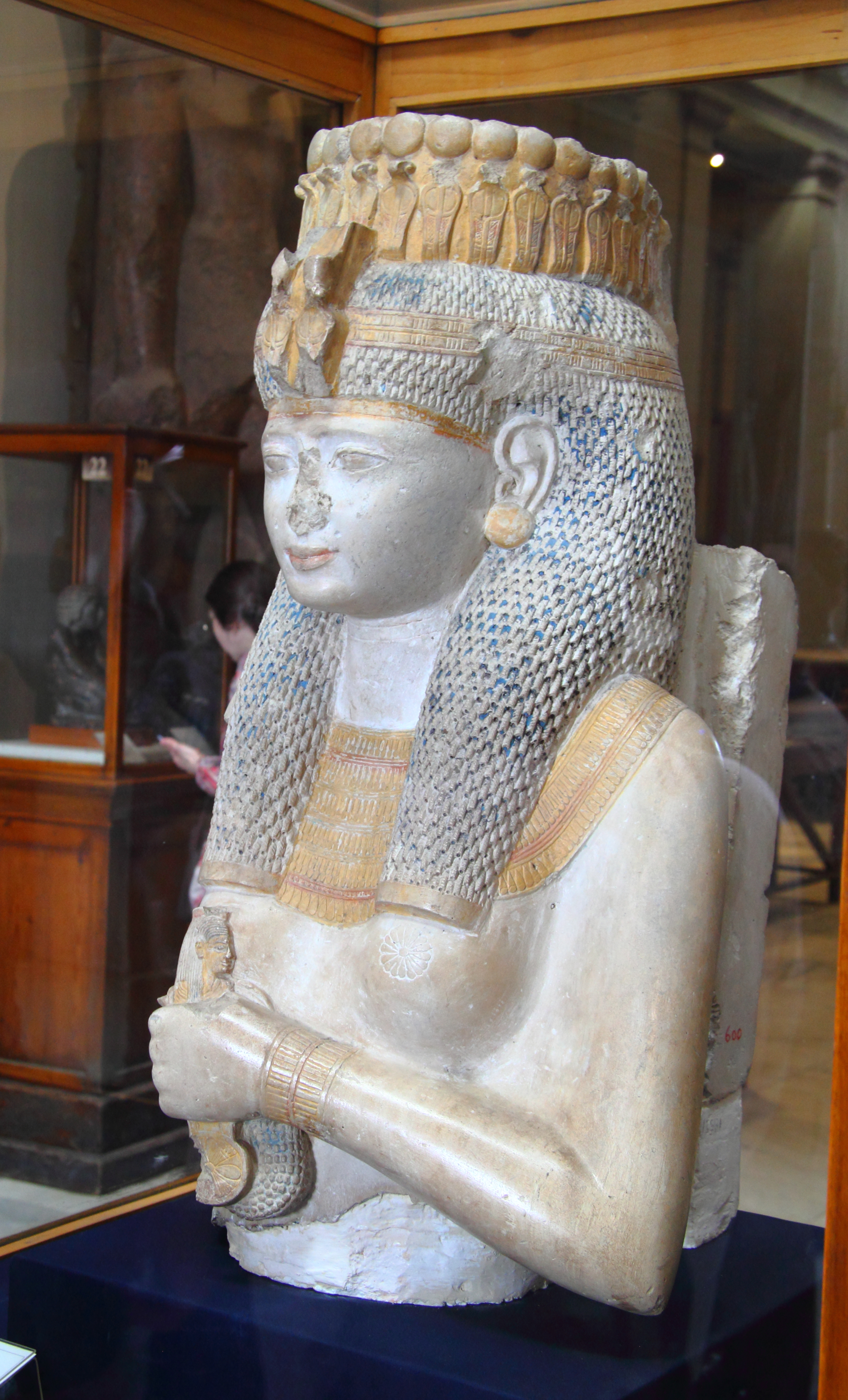
Statue of Meritamen, daughter of Ramesses II, wearing a modius decorated with uraei. From the Ramesseum, 19th Dynasty.

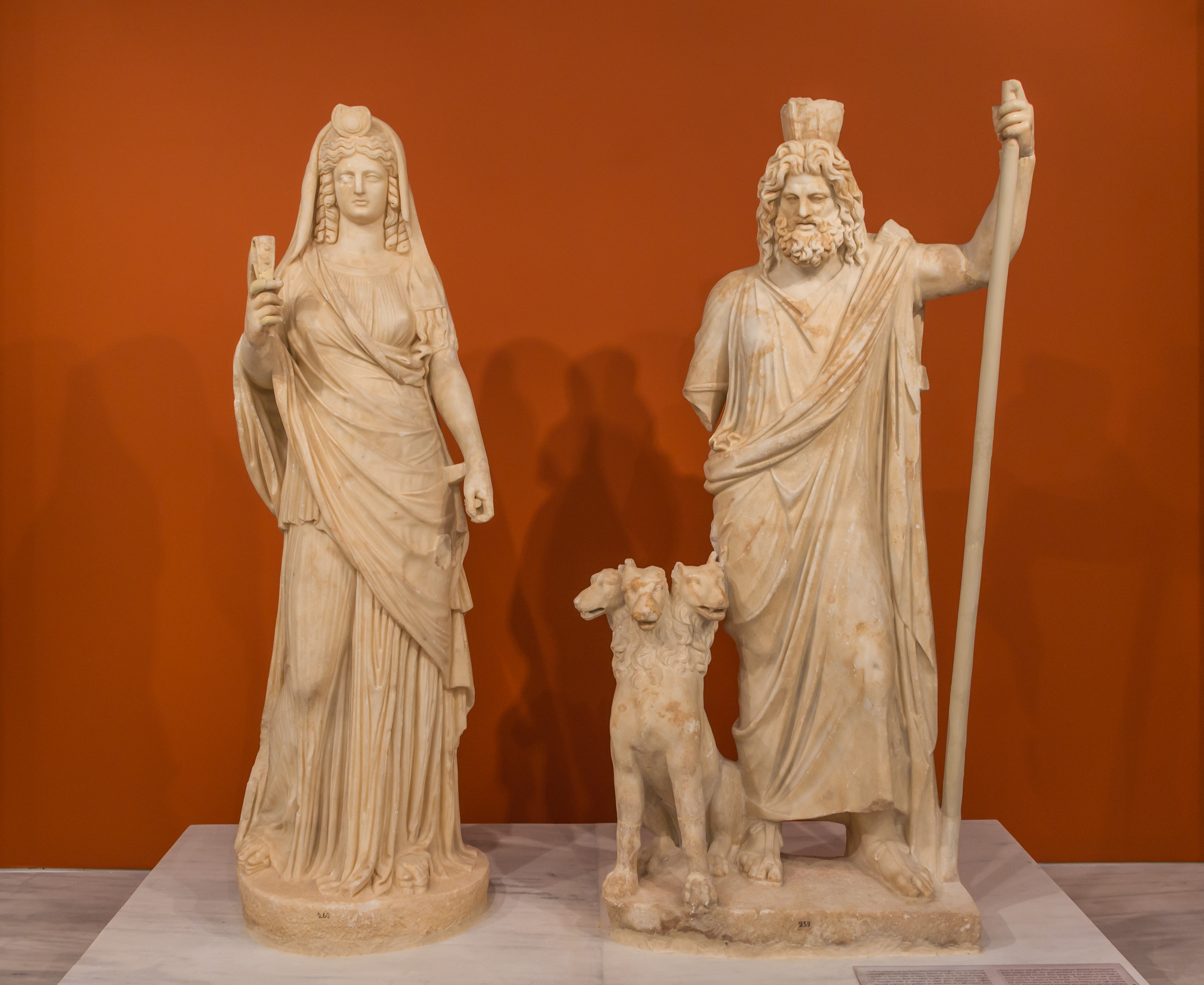
Syncretic (blended-beliefs) gods Persephone-Isis and Hades-Serapis, with the latter on the right wearing a modius

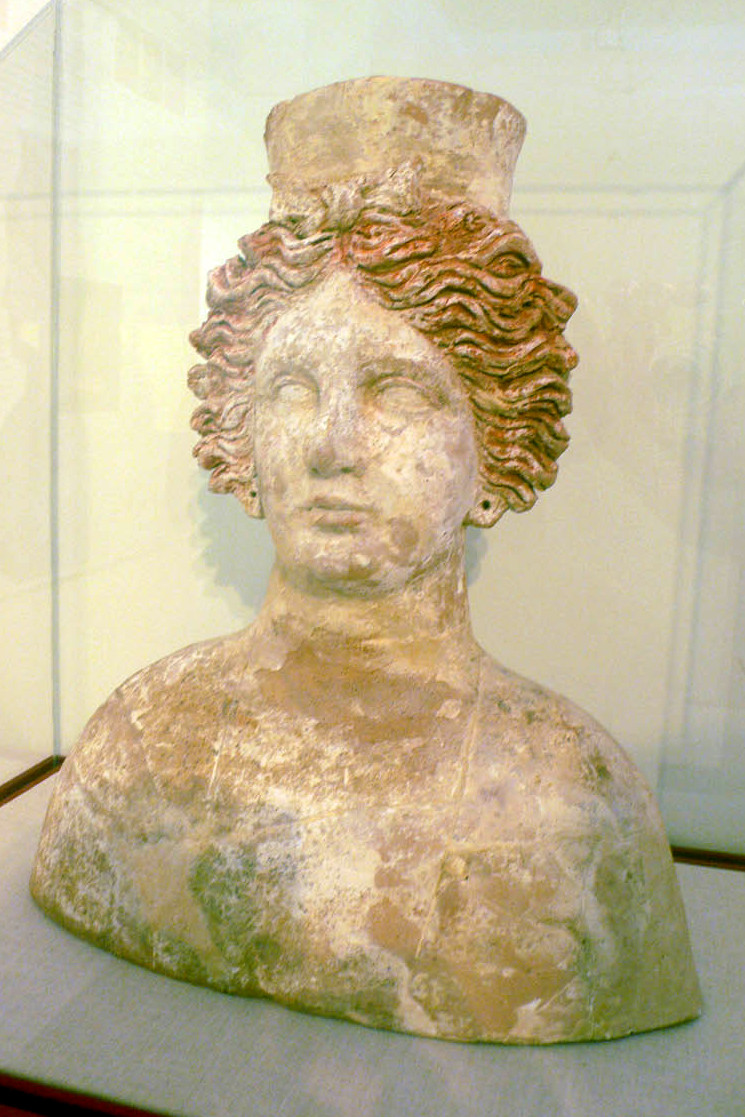
Ancient bust of Demeter or possibly Tanit

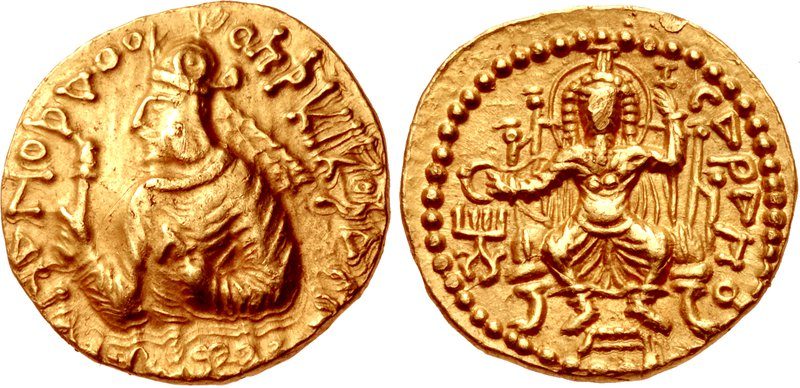
Kushan ruler Huvishka with seated Roman Egyptian god Serapis ("Sarapo") wearing the modius.

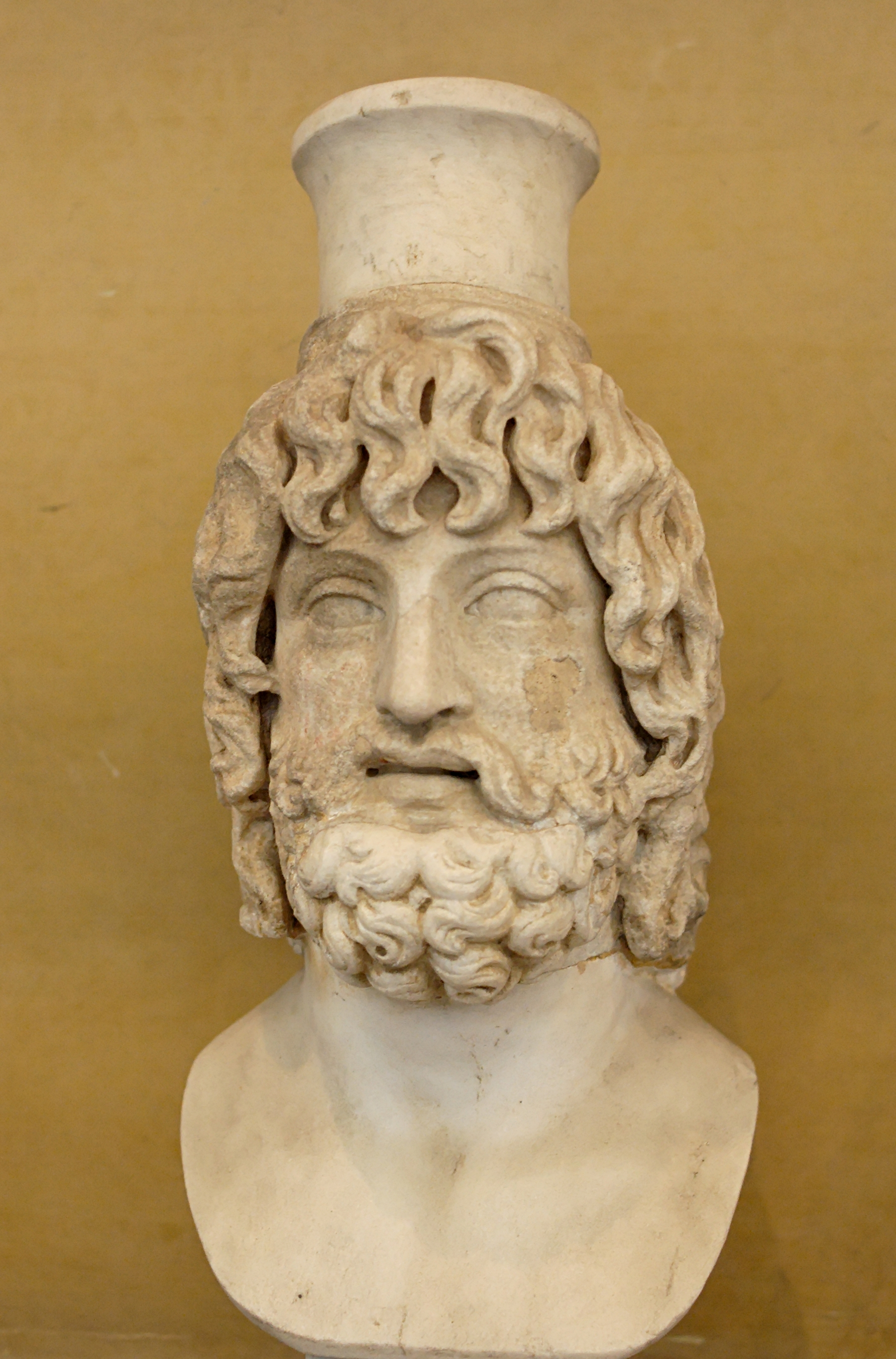
Serapis wearing the modius

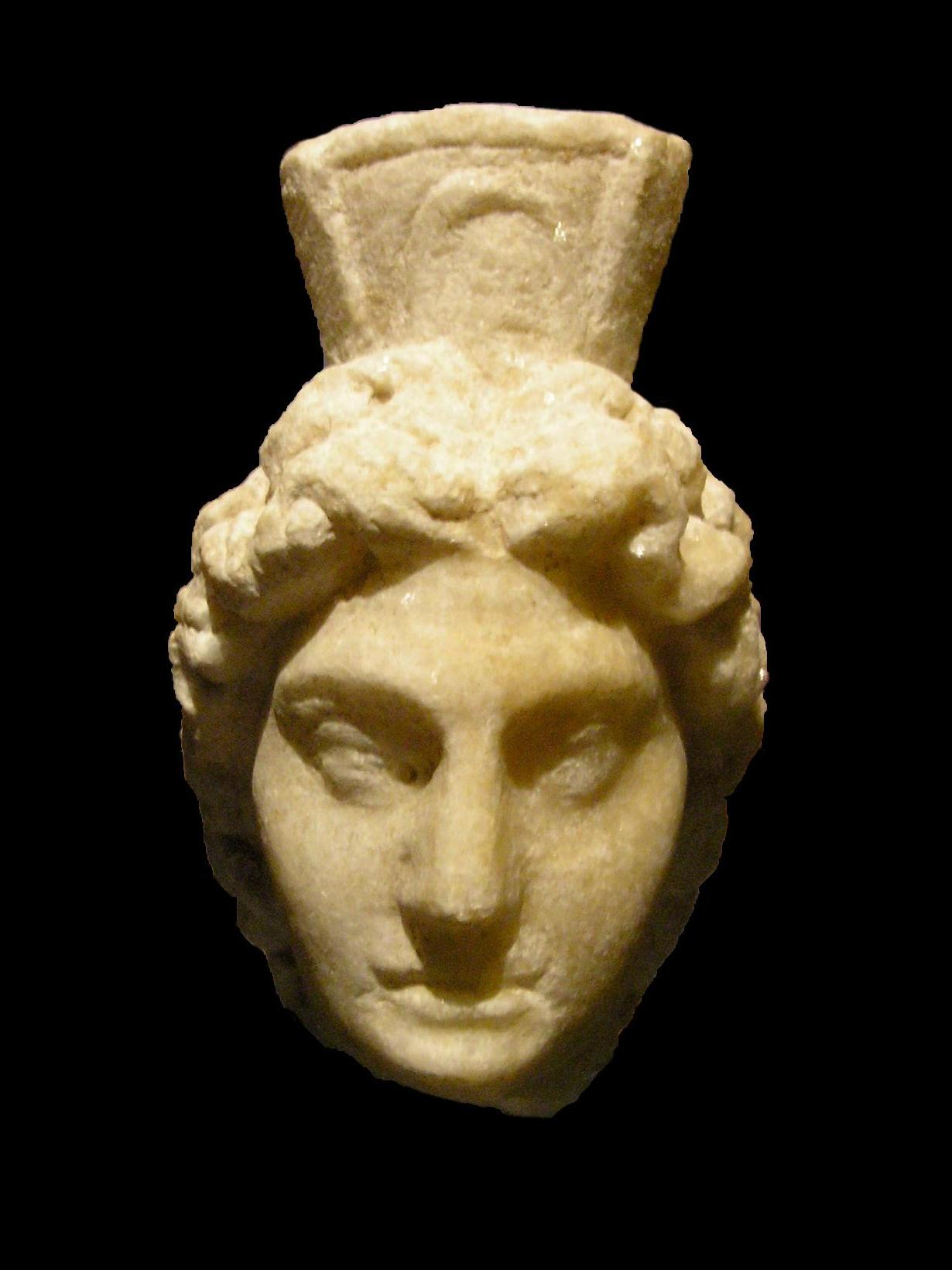
Head of a genius found at the Roman military camp Vindobona

== See also ==
- Polos
- Crowns of Egypt
- Fez
