= Serapis =

Graeco-Egyptian deity

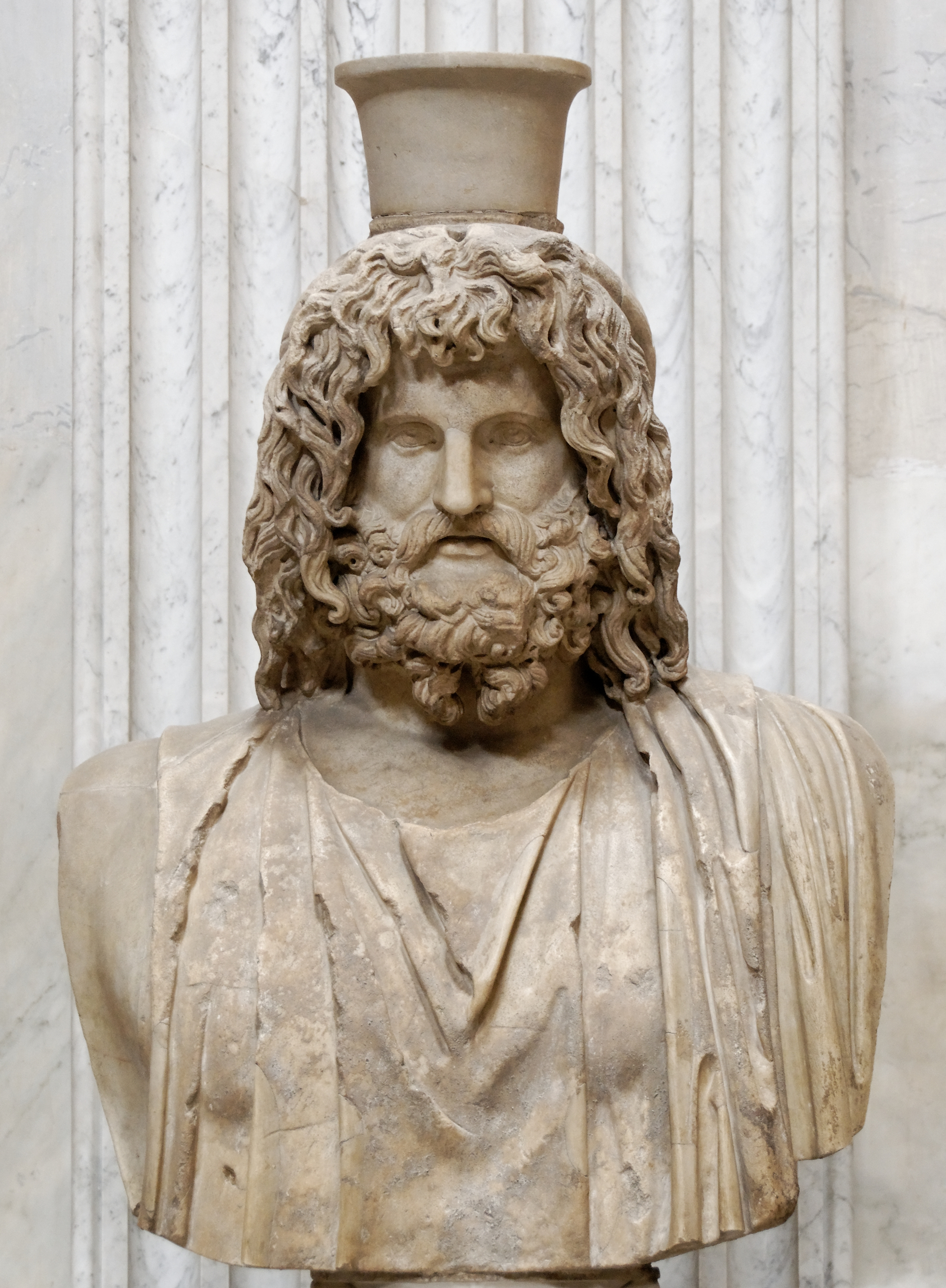
- Marble bust of Serapis wearing a modius
Name in hieroglyphs
st ir A40 H Hp p E1
wsjr-ḥp
Koine Greek: Σέραπις
- Major cult center: Serapeum of Alexandria

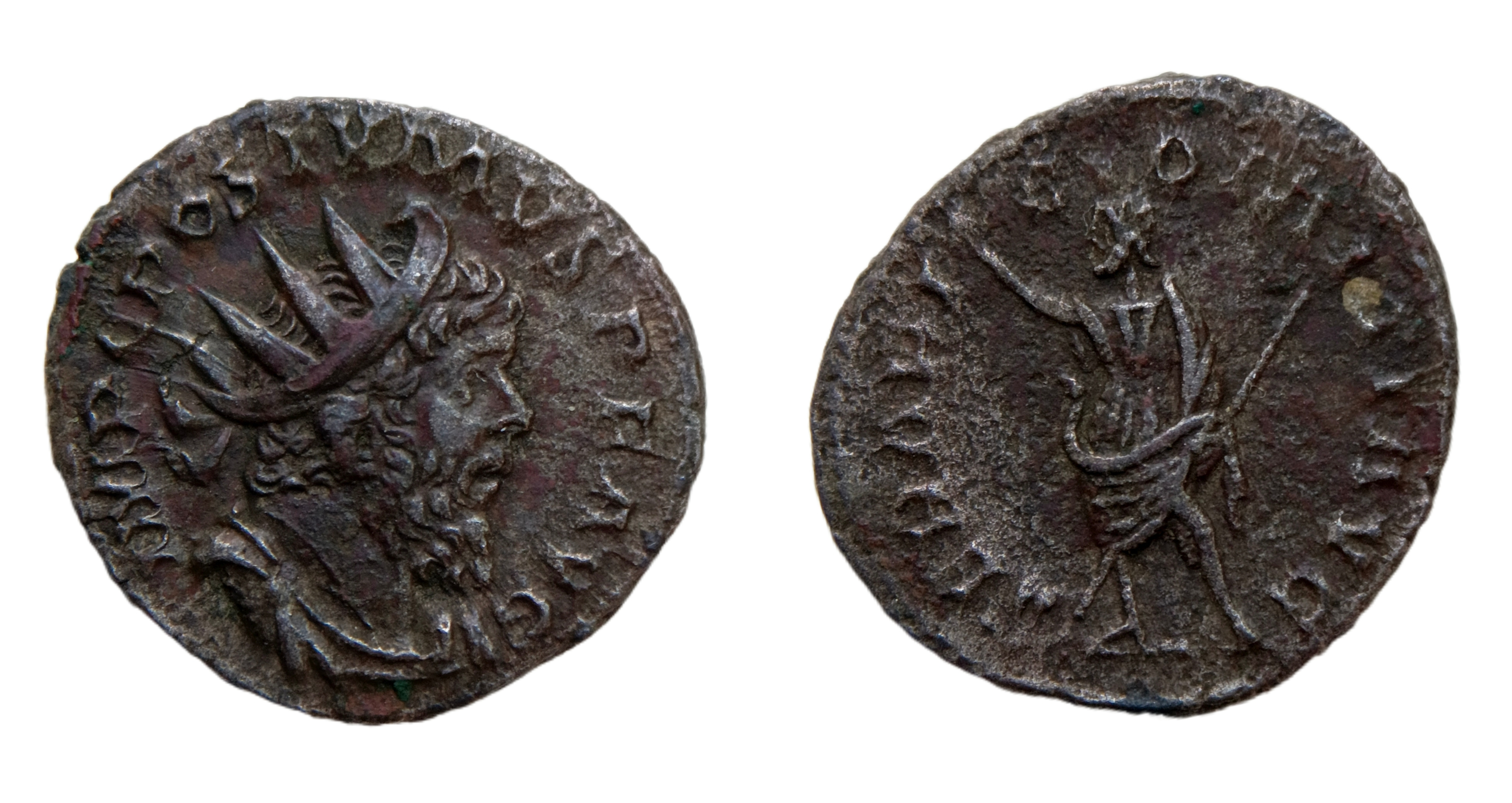
Antoninianus of Postumus with Serapis on the reverse

Serapis or Sarapis is a Graeco-Egyptian god. A syncretic deity derived from the worship of the Egyptian gods Osiris and Apis, Serapis was extensively popularized in the third century BC on the orders of Greek pharaoh Ptolemy I Soter, as a means to unify the Greek and Egyptian subjects of the Ptolemaic Kingdom.

The cultus of Serapis was spread as a matter of deliberate policy by subsequent Ptolemaic kings. Serapis continued to increase in popularity during the Roman Empire, often replacing Osiris as the consort of Isis in temples outside Egypt. Alongside his Egyptian roots he gained attributes from other deities, such as chthonic powers linked to the Greek Hades and Demeter, and benevolence derived from associations with Dionysus.

== Etymology ==
Originally known in Demotic as wsjr-ḥp, ("Osiris-Apis"), the name of the deity is derived from the syncretic worship of Osiris and the bull Apis as a single deity under the Egyptian name wsjr-ḥp. This name was later written in Coptic as ⲟⲩⲥⲉⲣϩⲁⲡⲓ Userhapi; Greeks sometimes used an uncommon form Sorapis (Koine Greek: Σόραπις), slightly closer to the Egyptian name(s).

The earliest mention of a "Sarapis" occurs in the disputed death scene of Alexander the Great (323 BCE), but it is something of a mix-up: The unconnected Babylonian god Ea (Enki) was titled Šar Apsi, meaning 'king of the Apsu' or 'the watery deep', (Note: In the Babylonian Talmud a "Sar Apis" is mentioned as an idol believed to have been named after the biblical Joseph.) and Ea as Šar Apsi seems to be the deity intended in the description of Alexander's death. Since this "Sarapis" had a temple at Babylon, and was of such importance that only Sarapis is named as being consulted on behalf of the dying king, Sarapis of Babylon appears to have radically altered perceptions of mythologies in the post-Alexandrian era. His significance to the Hellenic psyche, due to the mention in the story of Alexander's death, may have also contributed to the choice of the similar-sounding Osiris-Apis as the chief Ptolemaic god, even if the Ptolemies understood that they were different deities.

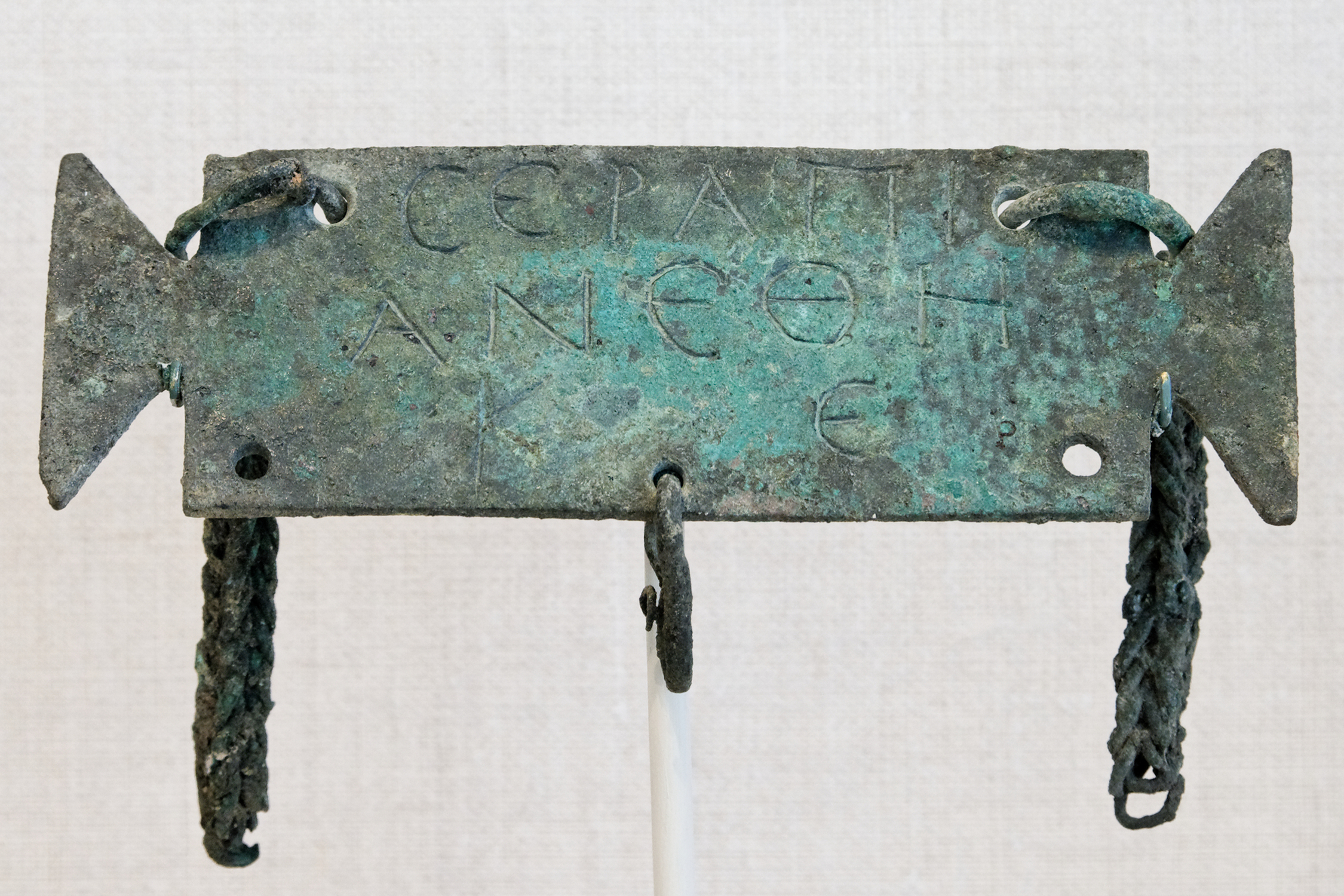
Bronze votive tablet inscribed to Serapis (2nd century)

Sarapis (Σάραπις, earlier form) was the most common form in Ancient Greek until Roman times, when Serapis (Koine Greek: Σέραπις, later form) became common. (Note: Consulting the unabridged Lewis and Short Latin lexicon shows that "Serapis" was the most common Latin version of the name in antiquity.)

A serapeum (Koine Greek: σεραπεῖον serapeion) was any temple or religious precinct devoted to Serapis. The most renowned serapeum was in Alexandria. (Note: "Of the Egyptian sanctuaries of Serapis the most famous is at Alexandria", Pausanias noted in the 2nd century CE, while describing the serapeion erected by Ptolemy at Athens, on the steep slope of the Acropolis: "As you descend from here to the lower part of the city, is a sanctuary of Serapis, whose worship the Athenians introduced from Ptolemy.")

== Iconography ==
Serapis was depicted as a Greek god in general appearance with Egyptian trappings, sometimes identified either as Pluto (Hades), Osiris, Dionysus, Amun, Zeus, Jupiter, Pan, Asclepius, and Dis Pater. (Note: As noted by Stambaugh, these associations could be sifted through the history of "court propaganda, scholarly theory, or popular piety". The ancient Hellenistic authors associated Serapis either with Pluto (Heraclides of Pontus; Archemachus of Euboea), Apis the bull (Nymphodorus of Syracuse; Phylarchus), Apis the king of Argos (Aristeas of Argos; Varro), with both Osiris and Apis (Athenodorus of Tarsus), and finally with both Helius and Zeus (Pseudo-Callisthenes; Macrobius).) The depictions of Serapis combined iconography from many Egyptian Greek cults, in most cases signifying the abundance and resurrection, namely, as the cornucopia horn and Calathus basket. Moreover, Serapis was generally considered to be the god of the underworld, healer, and protector of distressed, providing an asylum in his temple.

The Greeks had little respect for animal-headed figures, and so a Greek-style anthropomorphic statue was chosen as the idol, and proclaimed as the equivalent of the highly popular Apis. (Note: "Apollodorus identifies the Argive Apis with the Egyptian bull Apis, who was in turn identified with Serapis (Sarapis)"; Pausanias also conflates Serapis and Egyptian Apis: "Of the Egyptian sanctuaries of Serapis the most famous is at Alexandria, the oldest at Memphis. Into this neither stranger nor priest may enter, until they bury Apis".) It was named Userhapi (i.e. "Osiris-Apis"), which became Greek Sarapis, and was said to be Osiris in full, rather than just his ka (life force).

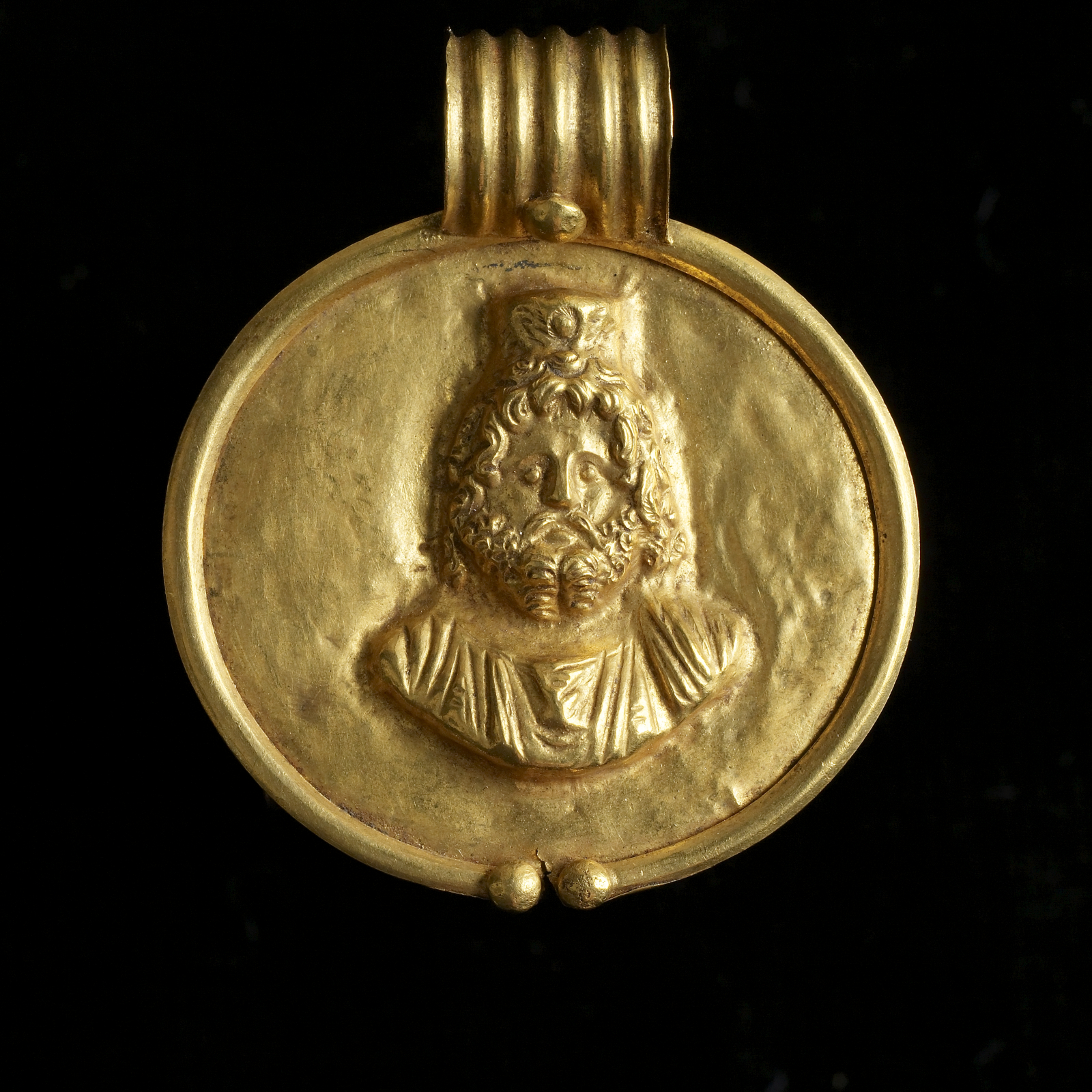
A pendant bearing Serapis's likeness, which would have been worn by a member of elite Egyptian society

The cult statue of Serapis that Ptolemy I erected in Alexandria enriched the texture of the Serapis conception by portraying him in a combination of both Egyptian and Greek styles. The statue suitably depicted a figure resembling Hades or Pluto, both being kings of the Greek underworld, and was shown enthroned with the modius, a basket/grain-measure, on his head, since it was a Greek symbol for the land of the dead. He also held a sceptre in his hand indicating his rulership, with Cerberus, gatekeeper of the underworld, resting at his feet. The statue also had what appeared to be a serpent at its base, fitting the Egyptian symbol of rulership, the uraeus.

== Serapis cult history ==
There is evidence that the cult of Serapis existed before the Ptolemies came to power in Alexandria; a temple of Serapis in Egypt is mentioned in 323 BCE by both Plutarch and Arrian.

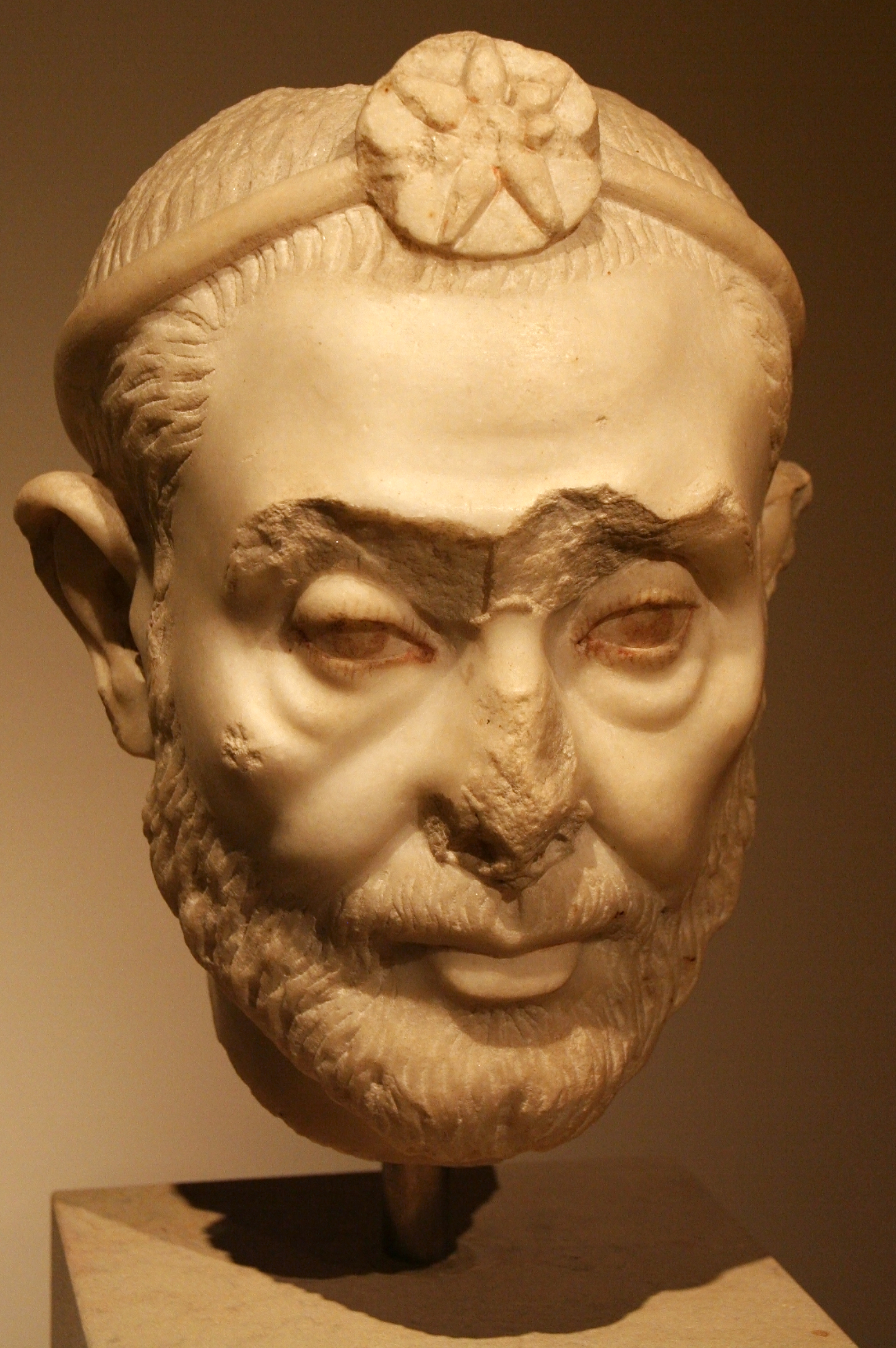
Head of a high cleric from the cult of Serapis

Ptolemy I Soter made efforts to integrate his new Egyptian subject's religions with that of their Hellenic rulers. Ptolemy's project was to find a deity that would win the reverence of both groups alike, despite the curses the Egyptian priests had chanted against the gods of the previous foreign rulers (e.g. Set, who was lauded by the Hyksos). (Note: Alexander the Great had attempted to use Amun for the same purpose, but Amun was more widely known in Upper Egypt, and not as popular in the more Mediterranean-oriented Lower Egypt, where international Hellenistic culture influenced Egyptians more, and where the foreign resident Greek population was larger.) The common assertion that Ptolemy "created" the deity is derived from sources which describe him erecting a statue of Serapis in Alexandria. According to Plutarch, Ptolemy stole the cult statue from Sinope in Asia Minor, having been instructed in a dream by the "unknown god" to bring the statue to Alexandria, where the statue was pronounced to be Serapis by two religious experts. One of the experts was of the Eumolpidae, the ancient family from whose members the hierophant of the Eleusinian Mysteries had been chosen since before history, and the other was the scholarly Egyptian priest Manetho, which gave weight to the judgement both for the Egyptians and the Greeks.

Plutarch may not be correct, however, as some Egyptologists allege that the "Sinope" in the tale is really the hill of Sinopeion, a name given to the site of the already existing Serapeum at Memphis.

With his (i.e. Osiris's) wife Isis, and their son Horus (in the form of Harpocrates), Serapis won an important place in the Greek world. In his 2nd-century CE Description of Greece, Pausanias notes two Serapeia on the slopes of Acrocorinth above the rebuilt Roman city of Corinth, and one at Copae in Boeotia.

Serapis figured among the international deities whose cult was received and disseminated throughout the Roman Empire, with Anubis sometimes identified with Cerberus. At Rome, Serapis was worshiped in the Iseum Campense, the sanctuary of Isis built during the Second Triumvirate in the Campus Martius. The Roman cults of Isis and Serapis gained in popularity late in the 1st century when Vespasian experienced events he attributed to their miraculous agency while he was in Alexandria, where he stayed before returning to Rome as emperor in 70 CE. From the Flavian Dynasty on, Serapis was one of the deities who might appear on imperial coinage with the reigning emperor.

Like many pagan cults of its time, the cult of Serapis declined during the rule of Theodosius I as the emperor, a Christian, implemented religious laws to restrict paganism across the empire. The main cult at Alexandria survived until the late 4th century, when a Christian mob directed by Pope Theophilus of Alexandria destroyed the Serapeum in Alexandria some time around 391 CE, during one of the frequent religious riots in the city.

== Jewish and Christian views ==
The origins of Serapis has been the source of speculation by both Jewish and Christian philosophers in ancient times. Tertullian in early 3rd century AD believed that belief in Serapis was inspired by Patriarch Joseph who is traditionally believed to have acceded to the office of chief administrator of Egypt. The same opinion was echoed in the Talmud.

== Gallery ==
Illustration of Serapis as a mummified man with the head of a bull, as he was sometimes depicted

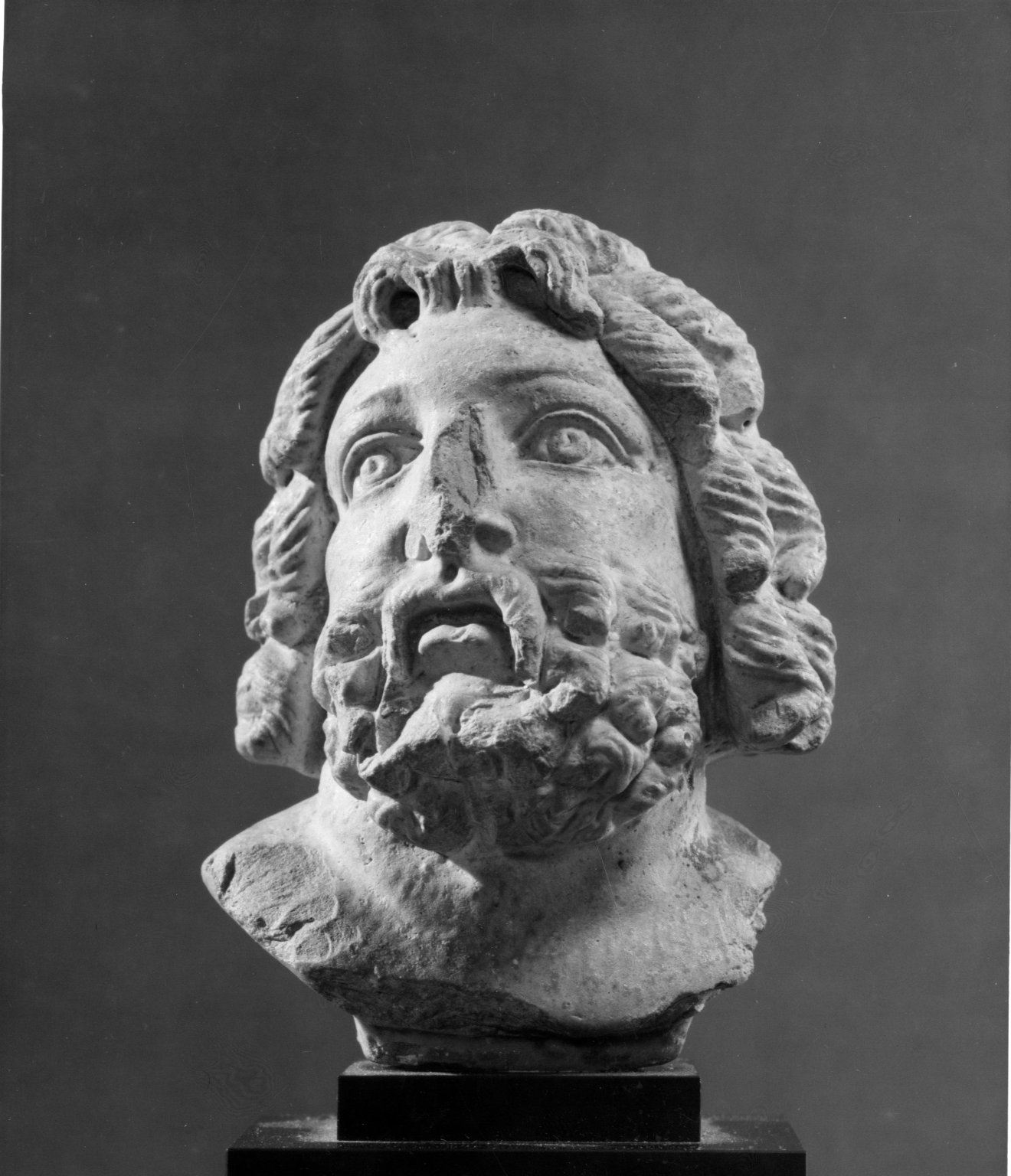
Head of Sarapis, 1st century BCE, 58.79.1 Brooklyn Museum

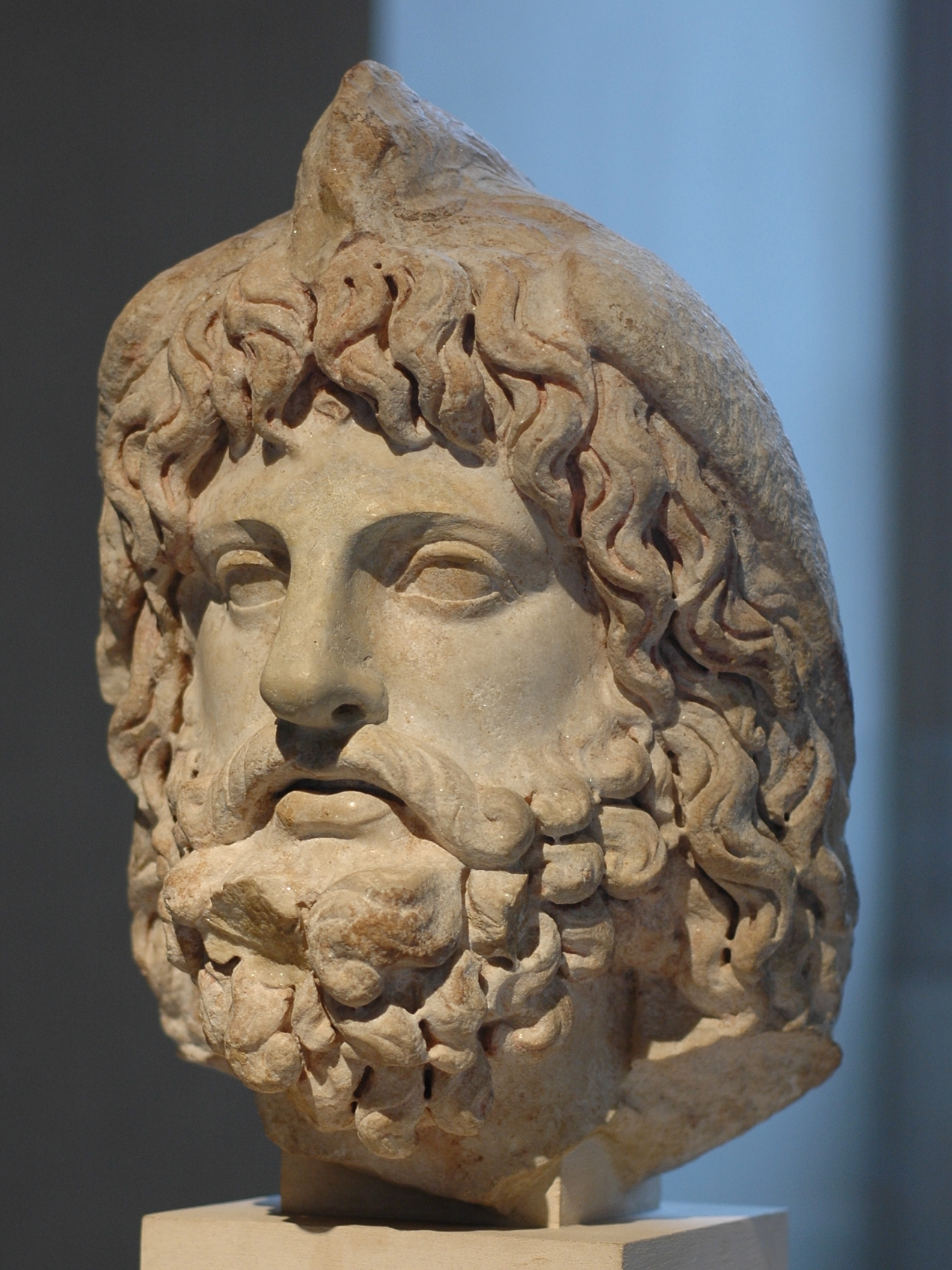
Head of Serapis, Carthage, Tunisia

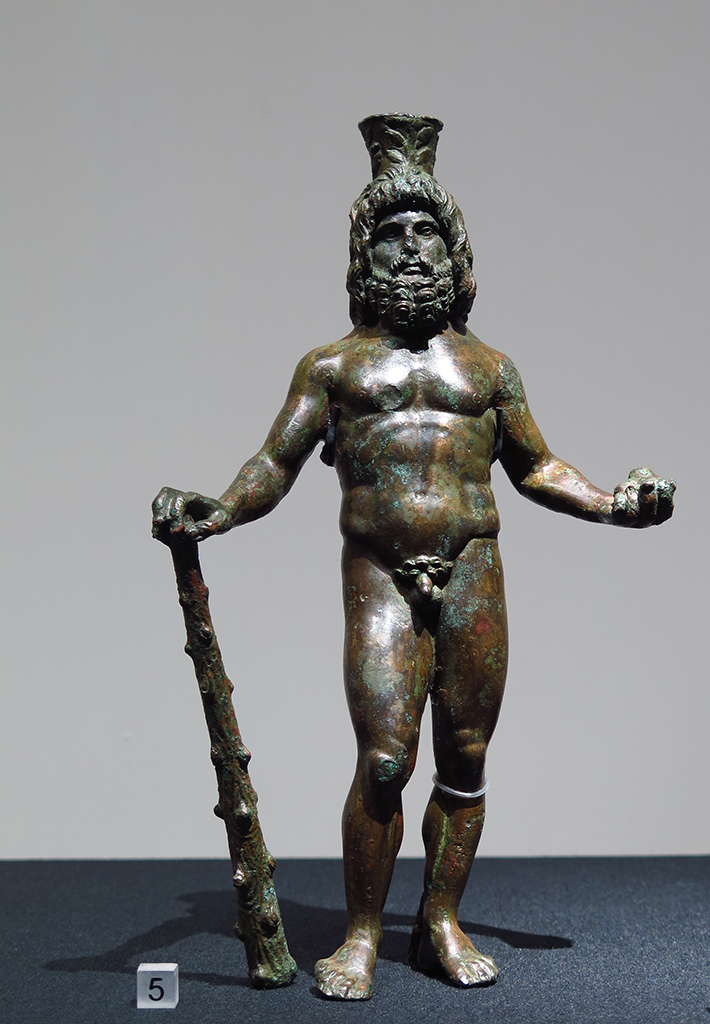
Statuette possibly of Serapis (note the Herculean club) from Begram, Afghanistan

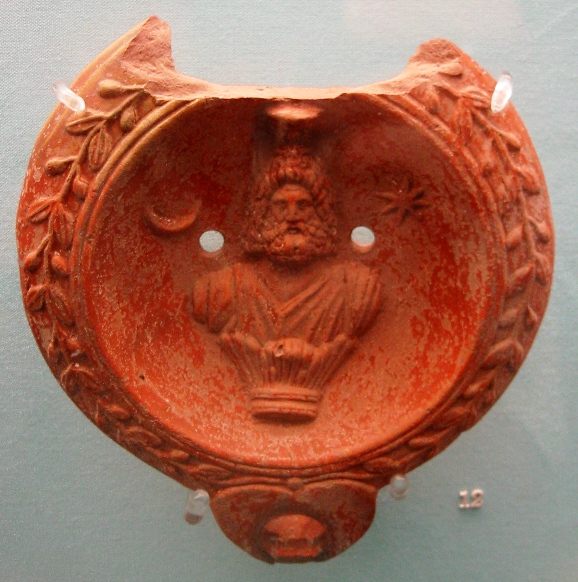
Oil lamp with a bust of Serapis, flanked by a crescent moon and star (Roman-era Ephesus, 100–150)

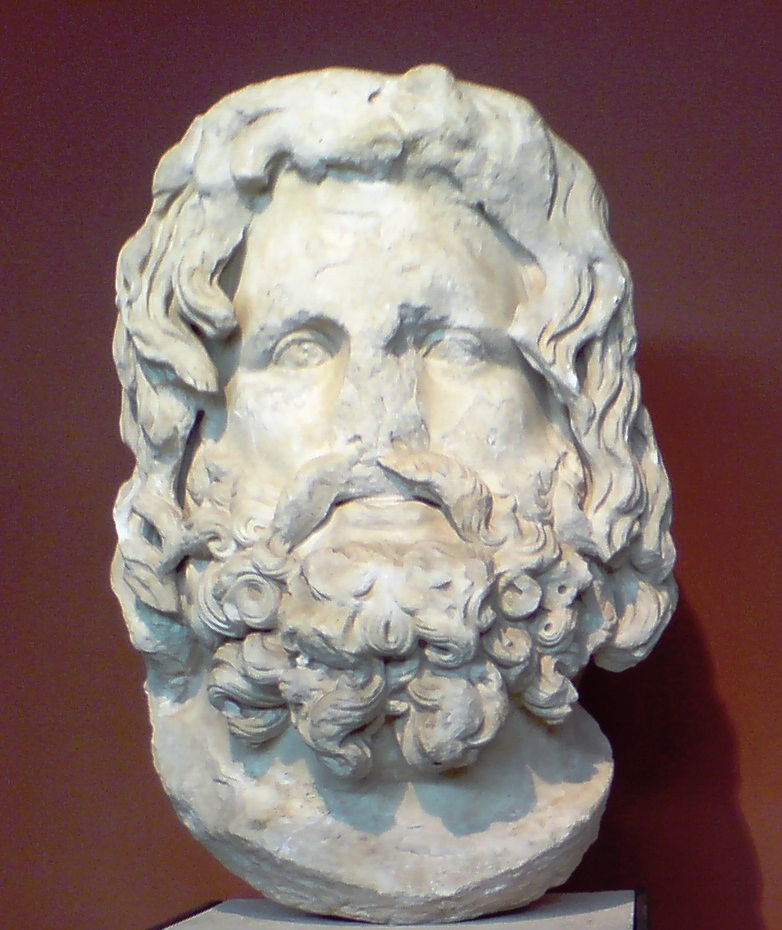
Head of Sarapis (150–200) from Salonica

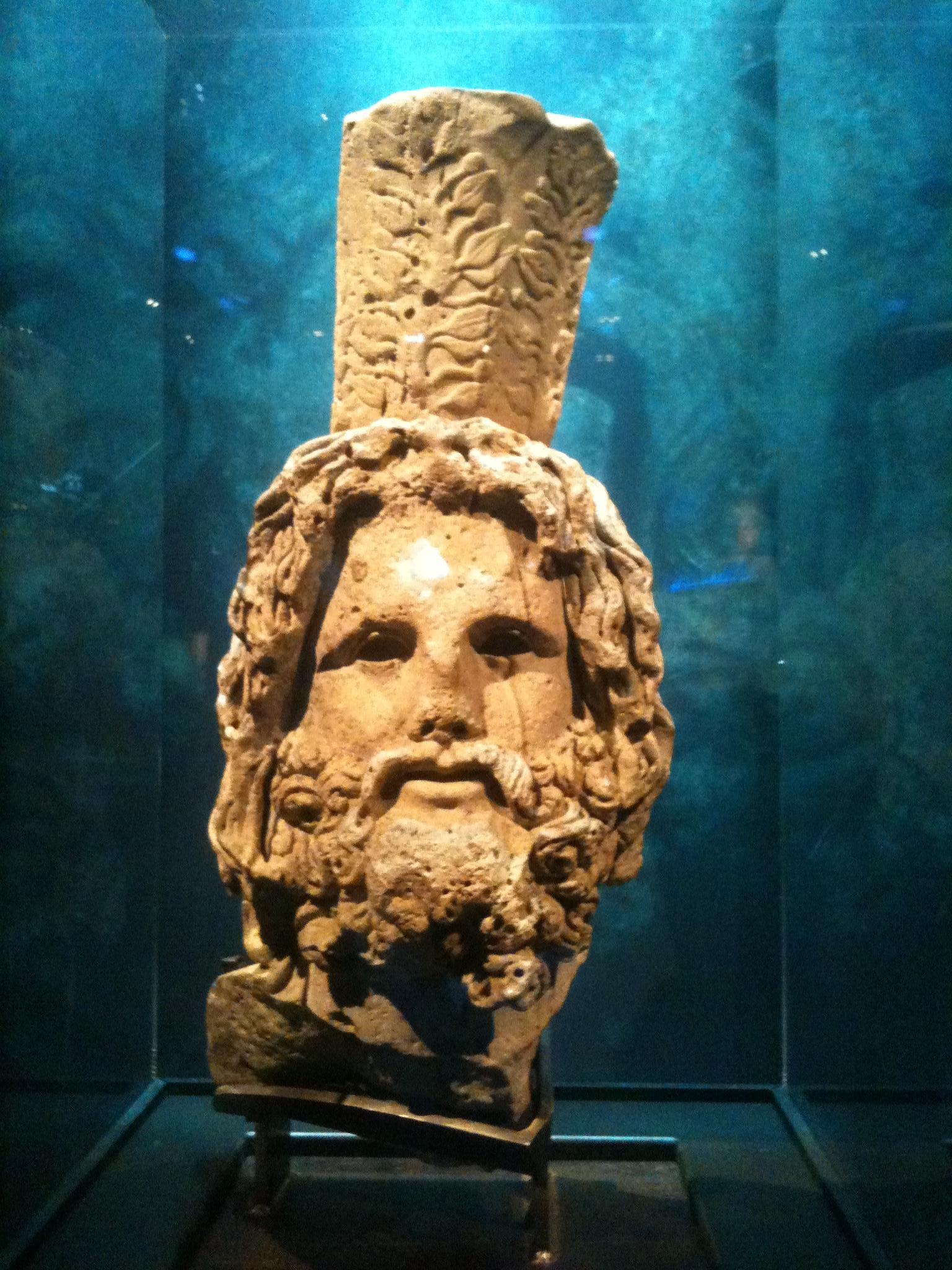
Head of Serapis, from a 3.7-metre (12 ft) statue found off the coast of Alexandria

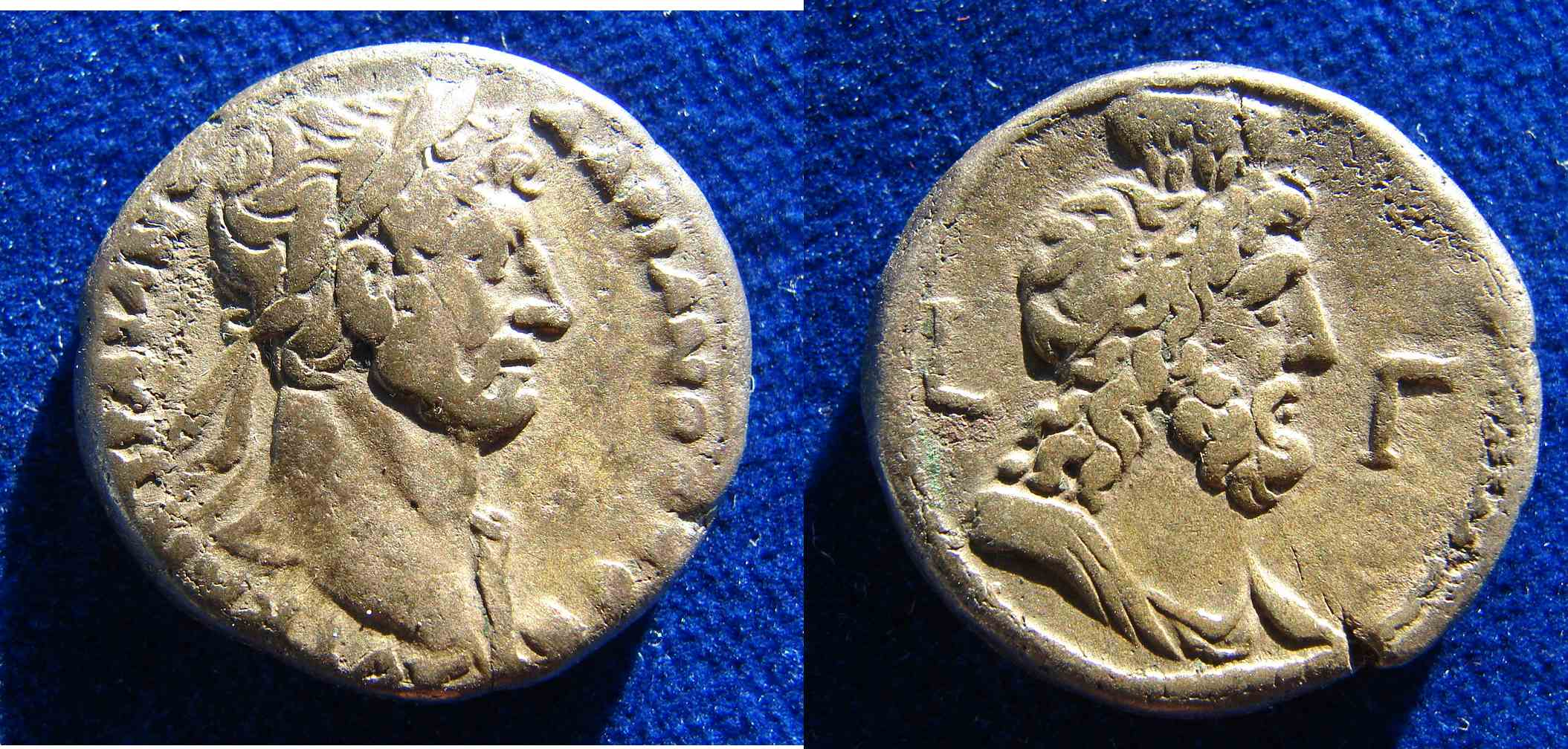
Serapis on the reverse of a Roman Egypt Billon Tetradrachm of Hadrian, minted in Alexandria c. 118-119 CE

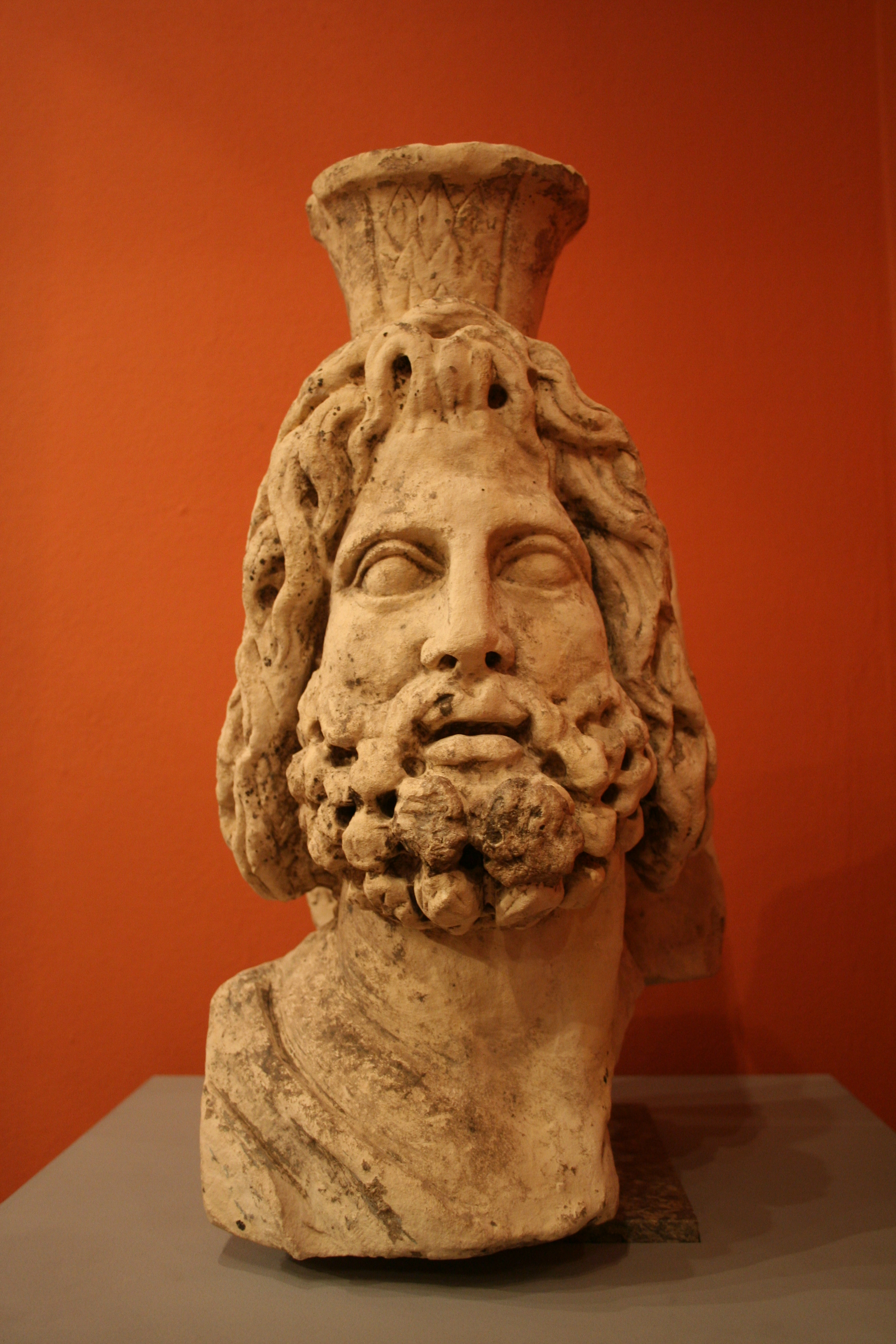
Bust of Serapis (Roman-era, terracotta, Staatliches Museum Ägyptischer Kunst, Munich)

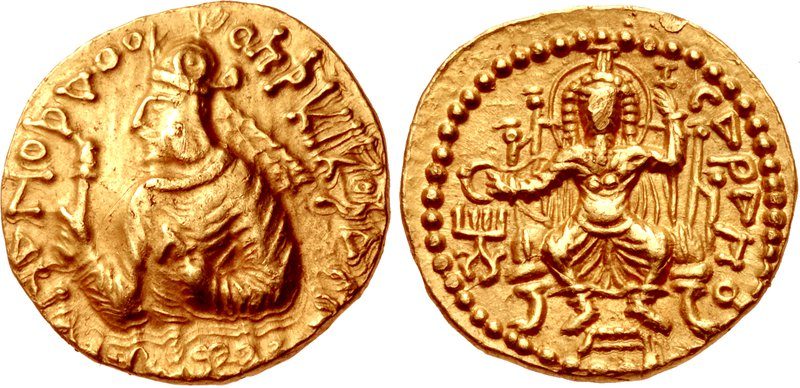
Dinar of Kushan ruler Huvishka with seated god Serapis ("Sarapo") wearing the modius, 2nd century CE

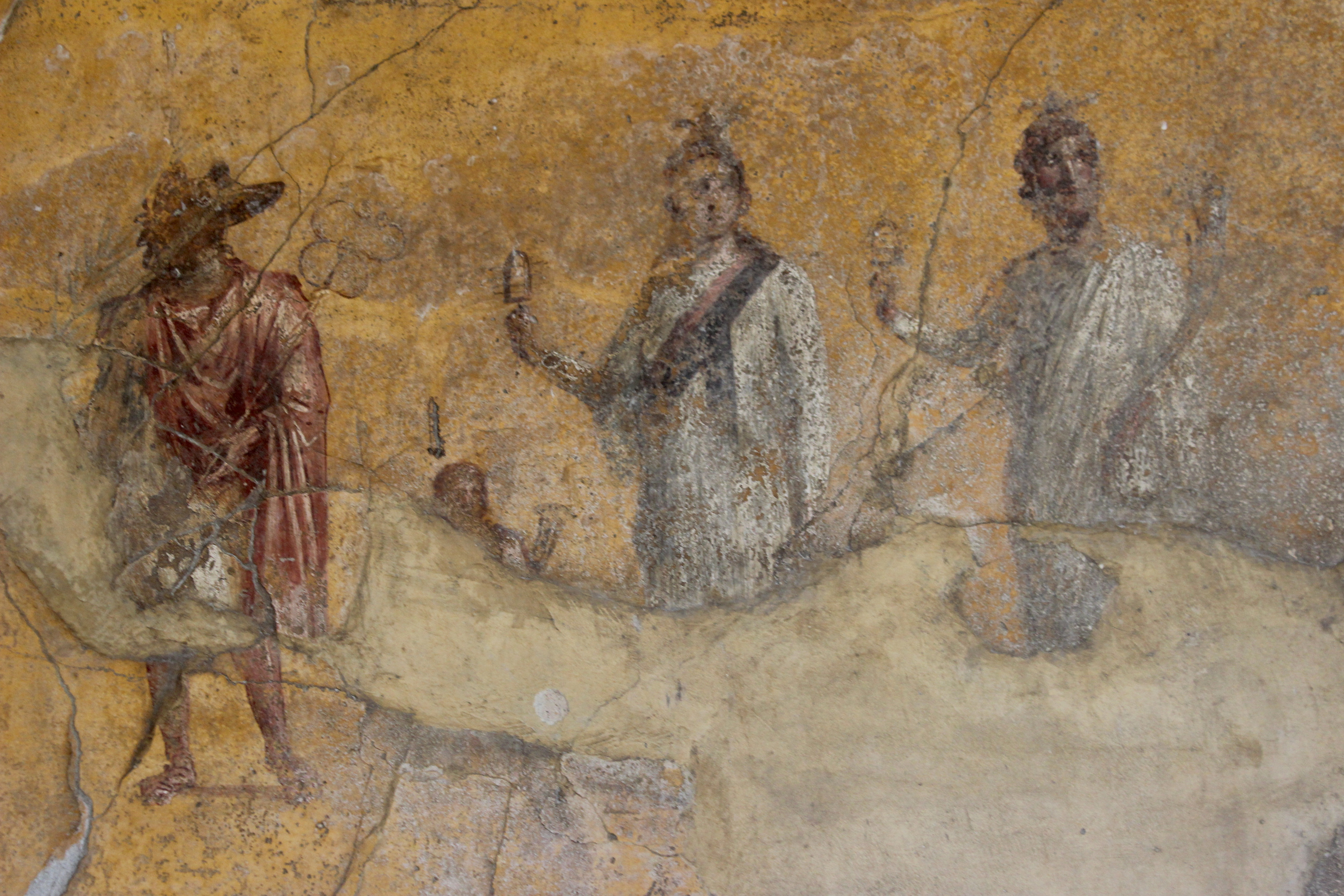
Anubis, Harpocrates, Isis and Serapis, from Pompeii, Italy

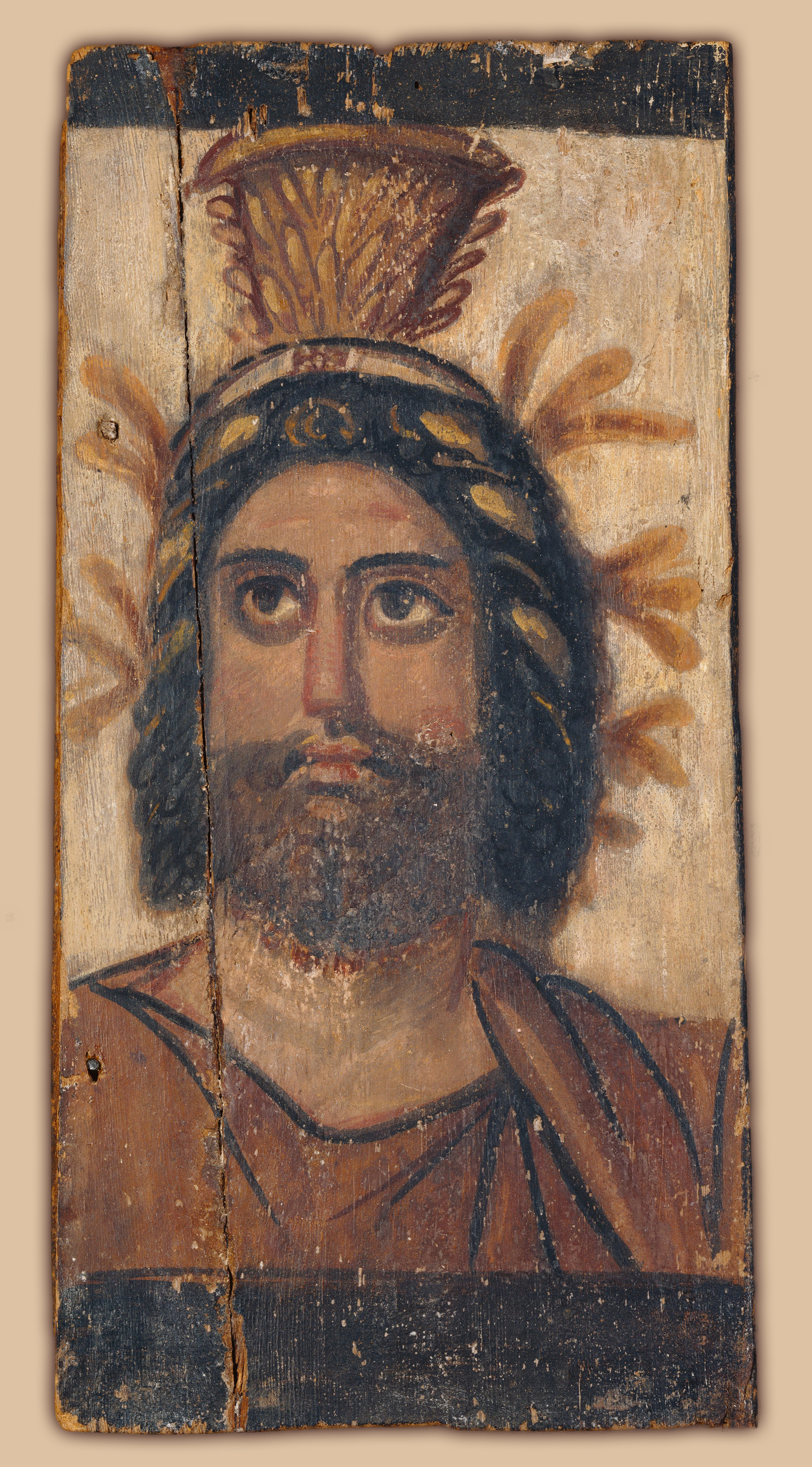
A well-preserved painting of Serapis

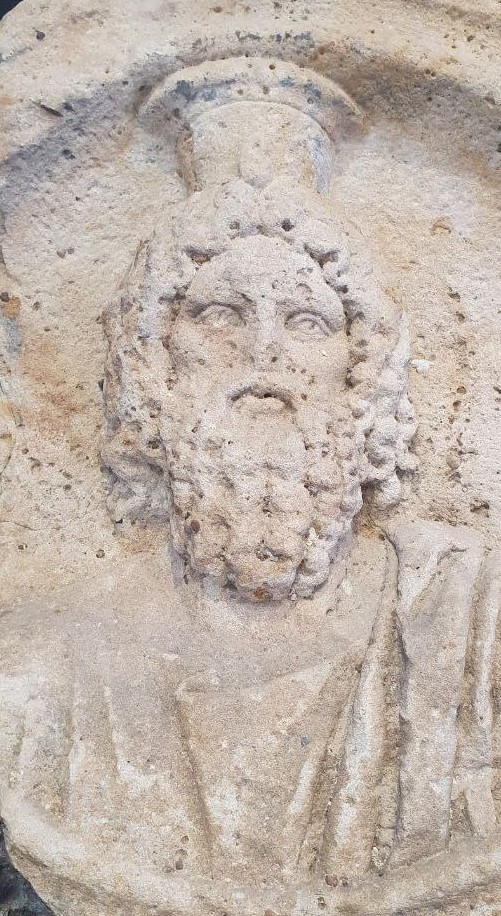
Serapis, Relief in Mainz, Germany

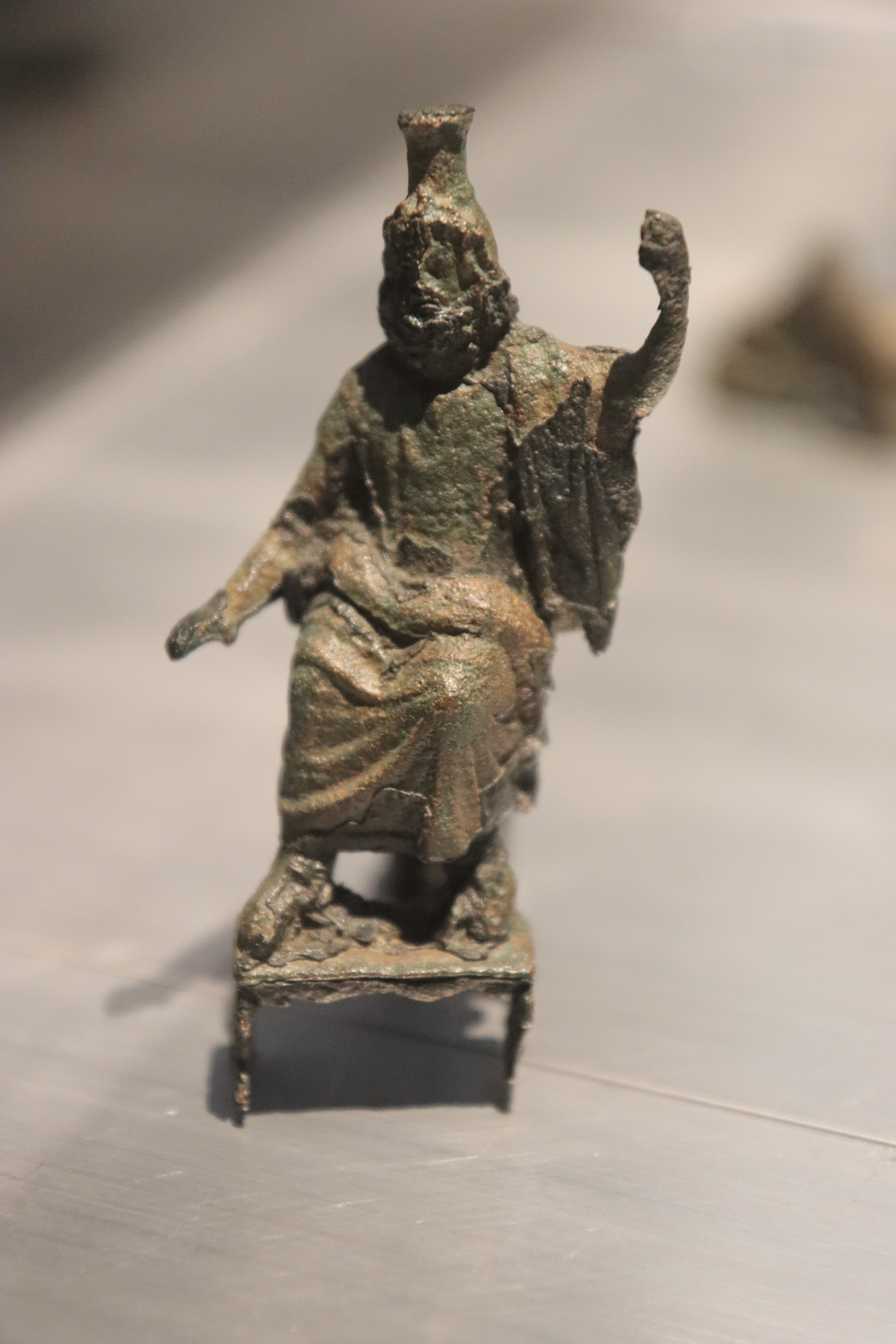
Bronze figurine of Serapis, from Gaza, Palestine

== See also ==
- Greeks in Egypt
- Syncretism

== Sources ==
- Borgeaud, Philippe; Volokhine, Yuri (2000). "La formation de la légende de Sarapis: une approche transculturelle". Archiv für Religionsgeschichte (in French). 2 (1).
- Bricault, Laurent, ed. (8–10 April 1999). De Memphis à Rome. I^{er} Colloque international sur les études isiaques. Poitiers, FR: Brill. ISBN 9789004117365.
- Bricault, Laurent (2001). Altas de la diffusion des cultes isiaques (in French). Diffusion de Boccard. ISBN 978-2-87754-123-7.
- Bricault, Laurent, ed. (16–17 May 2002). Isis en Occident. II^{ème} Colloque international sur les études isiaques. Lyon, FR: Brill. ISBN 9789004132634.
- Bricault, Laurent (2005). Recueil des inscriptions concernant les cultes isiaques (RICIS) (in French). Diffusion de Boccard. ISBN 978-2-87754-156-5.
- Bricault, Laurent; Veymiers, Richard, eds. (2008–2014). Bibliotheca Isiaca. Editions Ausonius. Vol. I: ISBN 978-2-910023-99-7; Vol. II: ISBN 978-2-356-13053-2; Vol. III: ISBN 978-2-356-13121-8.
- Bricault, Laurent; Versluys, Miguel John; Meyboom, Paul G.P., eds. (11–14 May 2005). Nile into Tiber: Egypt in the Roman World. III^{rd} International Conference of Isis Studies. Faculty of Archaeology, Leiden University: Brill. ISBN 978-90-04-15420-9.
- Bricault, Laurent (2013). Les Cultes Isiaques Dans Le Monde Gréco-romain (in French). Les Belles Lettres. ISBN 978-2251339696.
- Bricault, Laurent; Versluys, Miguel John, eds. (13–15 October 2011). Power, Politics and the Cults of Isis. V^{th} International Conference of Isis Studies. Boulogne sur Mer, FR: Brill. ISBN 978-90-04-27718-2.
- Hornbostel, Wilhelm (1973). Sarapis: Studien für Überlieferungsgeschichte, des Erscheinungsformen und Wandlungen der Gestalt eines Gottes (in German). E. J. Brill. ISBN 9789004036543.
- Merkelbach, Reinhold (1995). Isis regina—Zeus Sarapis. Die griechisch-aegyptische Religion nach den Quellen dargestellt (in German). B.G. Teubner. ISBN 978-3-519-07427-4.
- Pfeiffer, Stefan (2008). "The god Serapis, his cult and the beginnings of the ruler cult in Ptolemaic Egypt". In McKechnie, Paul; Guillaume, Philippe (eds.). Ptolemy II Philadelphus and his World. Brill. ISBN 978-90-04-17089-6.
- Renberg, Gil H. (2017). Where Dreams May Come: Incubation sanctuaries in the Greco-Roman world. Brill. ISBN 978-90-04-29976-4.
- Smith, Mark (2017). Following Osiris: Perspectives on the Osirian afterlife from four millennia. Oxford University Press. ISBN 978-0-19-958222-8.
- Stambaugh, John E. (1972). Sarapis Under the Early Ptolemies. Leiden: E. J. Brill. pp. 1–13.
- Takács, Sarolta A. (1995). Isis and Sarapis in the Roman World. E.J. Brill. ISBN 978-90-04-10121-0.
- Tallet, Gaëlle (2011). "Zeus Hélios Megas Sarapis: un dieu égyptien 'pour les Romains'?". In Belayche, Nicole; Dubois, Jean-Daniel (eds.). L'oiseau et le poisson: cohabitations religieuses dans les mondes grec et romain. PUPS. ISBN 9782840508007.
- Thompson, Dorothy J. (2012). Memphis under the Ptolemies (2nd ed.). Princeton University Press. ISBN 978-0-691-15217-2.
- Vidman, Ladislav (1970). Isis und Serapis bei den Griechen und Römern (in German). Walter de Gruyter. ISBN 978-3111768236.
