= Apladad =

Mesopotamian god

- God of Suhum
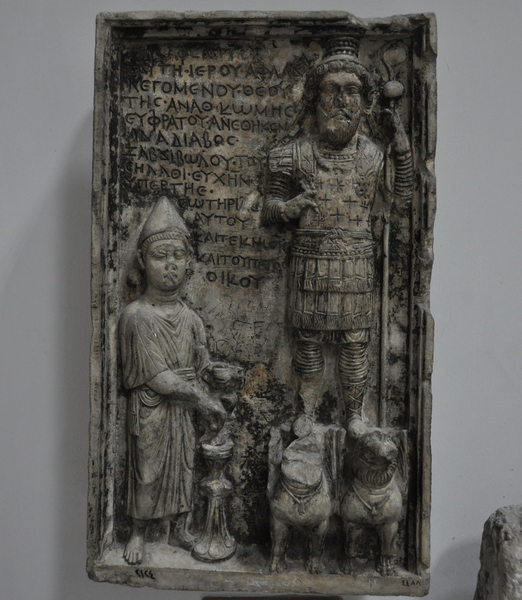
- A stela depicting Aphlad (Apladad) from Hellenistic Dura-Europos.
- Major cult center: Anat, Kannu’, Dura-Europos

Genealogy
- Parents: Adad (father)
- Spouse: ^{d}GAB.KA

Apladad (later Aphlad), "son of Adad", was a Mesopotamian god first attested in the eighth century BCE. He was chiefly worshiped in Suhum in cities such as Anat and Āl-gabbāri-bānî. He is mentioned in many inscriptions of local rulers, who built a number of houses of worship dedicated to him. He was also venerated in the city of Kannu’, whose location is presently unknown. While most of the evidence pertaining to him comes from between the eighth and sixth centuries BCE, he was still worshiped in Dura-Europos in the Hellenistic and Roman periods.

== Name and character ==
The theonym Apladad, also spelled as Apladdu or Apla-Adad can be translated as "son of Adad" or "heir of Adad", Adad being the Mesopotamian weather god. Attested cuneiform writings include ^{d}A.10, and less commonly ^{d}IBILA.^{d}IŠKUR, ^{d}A.^{d}IŠKUR, A.IŠKUR, ^{d}A.IŠKUR, ^{d}DUMU.^{d}IŠKUR, ^{d}IBILA-ad-du, or ap-la-du, while in alphabetic scripts (such as Aramaic) it was written as ‘pld or pld. In early scholarship, the name was incorrectly interpreted as ^{d}mār šarri, "son of the king".

Not much is known about Apladad's associations with other deities, and while a single late Babylonian seal inscription indicates that he was believed to have a wife, the reading of her name, ^{d}GAB.KA, remains uncertain, with Gabra being proposed by Edward Lipiński. Whether Apladad was related to Būru, a divine bull calf attested as a deity subordinate to Adad mostly in Aramean sources from the Neo-Assyrian period and later, remains unknown. This proposal relies on the analogous distribution of references to both deities in known texts, and on a possible analogy between the pairs Adad-Būru/Apladad and Teshub-Šarruma, but no conclusions can be reached based on available evidence.

== Worship ==
Introduction of Apladad to the Mesopotamian pantheon is considered to be a late development. He first appears in sources from the eighth century BCE, and it is presumed he only developed in this period. He is absent from most god lists, with the exception of a late text from this type from Sultantepe. Maria Grazia Masetti-Rouault suggests that he was linked to the royal ideology of the new dynasty which arose in the region known as Suhum, whose members despite their Assyrian origin seemingly developed a distinct cultural identity, which created the need for a new deity as well. One of the local rulers, Šamaš-reša-uṣur, in one of his inscriptions states that he built a new city, Āl-gabbāri-bānî, and "settled" Apladad (as well as Adad, Shala and Mandanu) in it. His son, Ninurta-kudurrī-uṣur, attributed his position as king to Shamash, Marduk, Adad and Apladad. In an inscription he refers to Apladad as his lord, and credits him with leading him to emerge victorious over his enemies in battle. Another text from his reign mentions the construction of a new city, Kār-Apladad, "quay of Apladad", and the establishment of a temple and regular offerings of bread and beer to him. Yet another inscription attributed to him indicates that a temple dedicated jointly to Adad and Apladad existed in the city of Anat. It bore the ceremonial name Enamḫe, which can be translated as "house of plenty".

Outside of Suhu, Apladad's main cult center was Kannu’, a city whose location remains uncertain. Additionally, a penalty clause in a single Neo-Assyrian document from Assur invokes Apladad alongside Adad. Theophoric names invoking him are also known. One example is Kullum-kī-Apladdu, "he is free through Apladad", presumed to belong to an inhabitant of Kannu’.

While most evidence for the worship of Apladad comes from between the eighth and sixth centuries BCE, his cult persisted in the middle Euphrates area through the Hellenistic period, well into Roman times. It is presumed that the god Aphlad, worshiped by culturally hellenized Arameans in Dura-Europos and attested both in inscriptions and theophoric names, can be identified as a later form of Apladad.
