= Polos =

Headdress of certain ancient Greek female gods

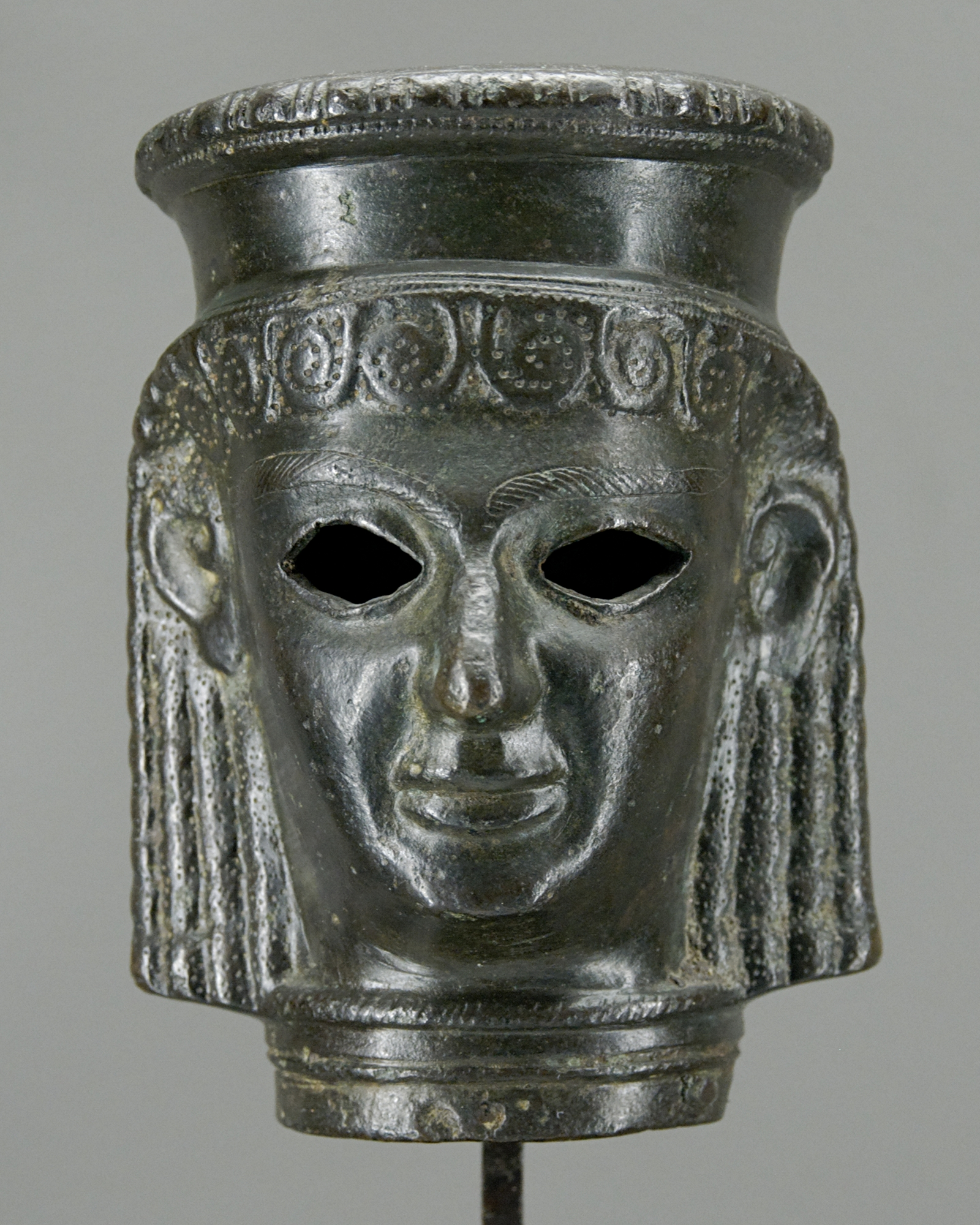
Female head wearing the polos. Bronze, second half of the 7th century BC. From Crete

The polos crown (plural poloi; Greek: πόλος) is a high cylindrical crown worn by mythological goddesses of the Ancient Near East and Anatolia and adopted by the ancient Greeks for imaging the mother goddesses Rhea, Cybele and Hera.

The word also meant an axis or pivot and is cognate with the English, 'pole'. It was often open at the top with hair cascading down from the sides, or it could be reduced to a ring.

In the classical period, mortal women seem not to have worn poloi, but they are more commonly seen in terracotta statues of women from the Mycenaean period, thus the use in statues of goddesses can be seen as a deliberate archaism.

Some poloi seem to have been made by weaving, though it is not clear what material. None have been found in archaeological digs, suggesting that they were not made of metal.

== See also ==
- Modius (headdress)
- Mural crown
