= Tell er-Retaba =

Coordinates: 30.5475°N 31.9636°E

Section of a Limestone Temple Relief of Ramesses II slaying an Asiatic enemy; from Tell El-Retaba. The god Atum offers the sword of victory to the king in exchange for the ritual sacrifice of the captive - Egypt Penn Museum

Tell er-Retaba (Arabic تل الرطابة Tall ar-Raṭāba; also spelled Tell el-Retaba, Tell er-Retabeh) is an archaeological site in Egypt. It is located in the eastern Nile Delta region of the semi-arid Wadi Tumilat. The oldest artifacts date from the 9th and 12th Dynasties of ancient Egypt. Major construction activity took place during the New Kingdom. The temple complex of "Atum, Lord of Tjeku" dates from the time of Ramses II. Since no further traces of settlement have been found for the period after 600 BC, it is assumed that the site was abandoned in favor of Tell el-Maschuta.

Some researchers, such as Manfred Bietak and Kenneth Kitchen, have identified Tell er-Retaba with the biblical Pithom, which is mentioned in the Book of Exodus (Exodus 1:11) alongside Pi-Ramesse as a settlement of the Israelites from which they departed from Egypt.

This opinion goes back to the 19th century, when Alan Gardiner first identified Pithom with the site of Tell El Retaba, and this was later accepted by William F. Albright, and Kenneth Kitchen. Although John van Seters and Neil Asher Silberman argue that Tell El Retaba was unoccupied during the period when we find monuments relating to a town called Pithom, this claim has been disputed by James K. Hoffmeier and Gary Rendsburg based on recent findings at the site.

The identification with Pithom is not definitive, as the successor settlement of Tell el-Mashuta is also a possibility.

== Archaeology ==
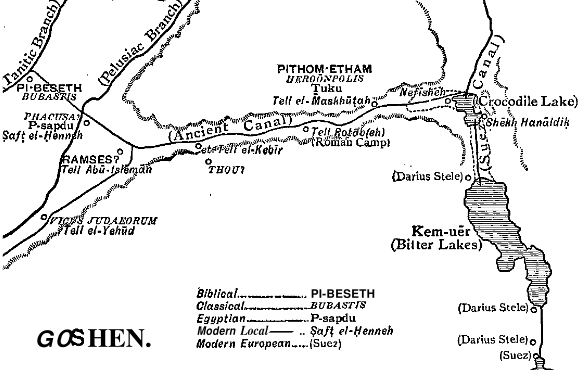
Tell Retabeh and Tell el-Maschuta on an old 1903 map. Tell Retabeh is marked as a 'Roman Camp'

The fortified city of Tell er-Retaba was the only major settlement in Wadi Tumilat during the New Kingdom and was uninhabited only from 600 to 400 BC. These findings suggest that it is highly likely Tell el-Maschuta was founded a short distance further east after Tell er-Retaba. During this period, Necho II (610–595 BC) commissioned the construction of a canal to the Red Sea, which ran through Wadi Tumilat.

The older Ramesside and Third Intermediate Period monuments originating from Tell el-Maschuta must therefore have been transported there at a later date. Kenneth Kitchen disagreed with this reconstruction. In his opinion, Tell er-Retaba (Pithom) and Tell el-Maschuta (Tjeku) existed simultaneously as significant settlements during the New Kingdom. However, Kitchen disregarded the ceramic evidence in his hypothesis.

Ramses III also erected monuments at this site and reinforced the fortress.

Since 2007, the site was investigated by a joint Polish-Slovak Archaeological Mission.

== See also ==
- Tjaru

== Bibliography ==
- Rzepka, S. (2016). "Grabungsvorberichte/Preliminary Excavation Reports: Tell el-Retaba, Polish-Slovak Mission. From Hyksos Settlers to Ottoman Pipe Smokers. Tell el-Retaba 2014". Ägypten und Levante (in German). 25: 97–166. doi:10.1553/AEundL25s97. ISSN 1015-5104.
- Alan Gardiner: The Delta Residence of the Ramessides. Vol IV. In: The Journal of Egyptian Archaeology. Vol 5, Nr. 4, 1918, ISSN 0307-5133, p. 242–271.
- John S. Holladay: Tell el-Maskhuṭa. Preliminary report on the Wadi Tumilat Project 1978–1979 (= Cities of the Delta. Vol 3 = American Research Center in Egypt. Reports. Nr. 6). Undena Publications, Malibu (CA) 1982, ISBN 0-89003-084-7.
- John S. Holladay: Tell el-Maschuta. In: Kathryn A. Bard, Steven Blake Shubert (Hrsg.): Encyclopedia of the archaeology of ancient Egypt. Routledge, London u. a. 1999, ISBN 0-415-18589-0, S. 786–789.
- Ellen Fowles Morris: The architecture of imperialism. Military bases and the evolution of foreign policy in Egypt's New Kingdom (= Probleme der Ägyptologie. [PdÄ] Band 22). Brill, Leiden u. a. 2005, ISBN 90-04-14036-0 (Zugleich: Dissertation; Universität Philadelphia (PA) 2001).
- Édouard Naville: The Store-city of Pithom and the Route of the Exodus (= Memoir of the Egypt Exploration Fund. Band 1, ISSN 0307-5109). Trübner, London 1885 (online).
- Mohamed I. Bakr, Helmut Brandl: Various Sites in the Eastern Nile Delta: Tell el-Maskhuta. In: Mohamed I. Bakr, Helmut Brandl, Faye Kalloniatis (Hrsg.): Egyptian Antiquities from the Eastern Nile Delta. = ʾĀṯār misrīya (= Museums of the Nile Delta. Band 2). Opaion, Kairo / Berlin 2014, ISBN 978-3-00-045318-2, S. 78 und 266–267, Katalog 72.
