= Tell el-Maschuta =

Archaeological site in Egypt

Coordinates: 30.552778°N 32.099444°E

Tell el-Maschuta in hieroglyphs
O1 Z1 X1 U15 Aa15 X1 O49
Per Tem
Pr Tm
House of Atum (Tem)
- Necropolis „Ero“
- Tell el-Maschuta; Hill of the Monument; Hill of the Damned / Idols
- Greek: Heroonpolis
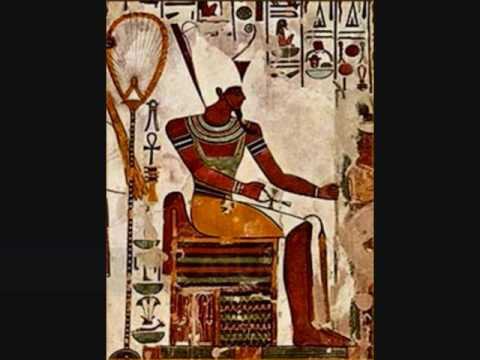
- Tem (Atum)

Tell el-Maschuta (Arabic: تل المسخوطة, romanized: Tell el-Mashūta) - either the ancient Egyptian Per Tem/Pi-Tem or Tjeku - is located in the Wadi Tumilat region in the eastern Nile Delta about 16 kilometers west of Ismailia and about 18 kilometers east of Tell er-Retaba.

The use of the site was subject to constant change. Originally founded during the Second Intermediate Period as a settlement of around two to three hectares, Tell el-Maschuta was re-founded at the end of the 7th century BC as a trading center and place of worship of the deity Atum (Tem), which was associated with the naming of Per Tem (Atum) in Tjeku under the ancient Egyptian pharaoh Necho II. Herodotus mentioned the "Arab city of Patumos" located in this region in connection with the canal construction begun by Necho II. In Hellenistic times, Per Tem probably bore the name Heroonpolis; however, this is not certain. The name Ero, which originated in Roman times, is the short form of Heroonpolis.

Earlier results of archaeological research initially led to the assumption that Tell el-Maschuta was the biblical Pithom. For example, Per Tem was also mentioned on the recovered statue of Ankhkherednefer, although this statue may have originated at another nearby site such as Tell er-Retaba. Other researchers have identified Tell el-Maschuta with the city of Tjeku. The Pithom stele from the Ptolemaic period shows that the old name Per Tem was still in use as a place name for Tell el-Maschuta several centuries after Necho II.

At the beginning of the 2nd century AD, the function of Tell el-Maschuta changed again and it now served as a Roman cemetery. Since the beginning of the 5th century AD, Tell el-Maschuta has only been a mound of ruins. From 1977 onwards, it was archaeologically examined several times during excavation campaigns.

== Etymology and research history ==
In earlier times, the site was called Ahou Kachah or Abou Keycheyd. A monolith was found there on which Ramesses II is depicted between two sun deities. Archaeologists therefore suspected that an ancient Egyptian city was located at the site, with the sand-covered monolith as a typical identifying feature.

Archaeological teams identified the site as Pi-Ramesses, the "place of the Israelites during their oppression", due to the Ramesses monolith. The supposed discovery prompted numerous archaeologists to intensify their research and excavations at "Pi-Ramesses" around 1860. However, further investigations led to the conclusion that it was not Pi-Ramesses.

Work on the Bubastis Canal was completed at around the same time. After the workers and archaeologists left, the interest in the Mound of the Monument, for which the modern translation Mound of the Damned/Heroes is also used, initially faded.

In 1883, Édouard Naville undertook another campaign in this region on behalf of the Egypt Exploration Society and discovered the ruins of Tell el-Maschuta. He examined the existing monuments, statues, inscriptions and building remains and drew up a ground plan of ancient Tell el-Maschuta. However, Naville did not examine the numerous pottery fragments and other small finds in the strata (horizontal excavation layers). In his final report, he came to the conclusion that it must have been the biblical Pithom, as the excavated objects included several monuments from the time of Ramesses II.

The French Egyptologist Jean Cledat carried out further investigations in the Wadi Tumilat region between 1900 and 1910 and was able to recover additional finds. John S. Holladay and his team initiated extensive excavations as part of the Wadi Tumilat project initiated by the Canadian University of Toronto. Five excavation campaigns took place from 1978 to 1985. More recently, research commissioned by the Egyptian Antiquities Authority has provided further information about Tell el-Maschuta.

== Archaeological studies ==
=== First colonization phase ===
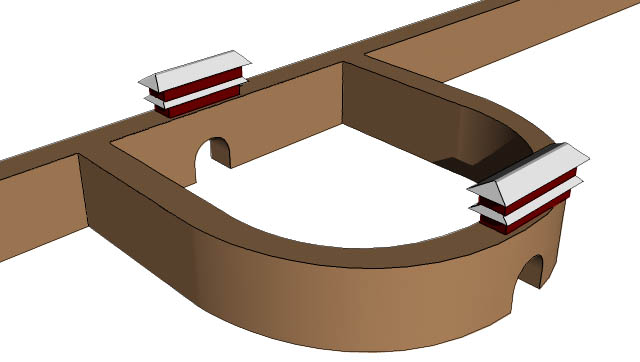
Example of Chinese curved city walls

The excavations prove that Tell el-Maschuta was founded during the Second Intermediate Period. The name of the village at that time has not yet been determined. The small village resembled an outpost, as there were no special fortifications. The shape of the curved city walls used at this time is characteristic. There is evidence of a continuous increase in burials and the construction of above-ground circular silos during the construction phase of Tell el-Maschuta. The tombs showed striking differences in terms of the status of the buried persons. Warrior burials included the Asian-style weaponry typical of this period, such as daggers and chisel-shaped axes. The other mud-brick graves contained numerous valuable grave goods such as gold or silver headbands and silver-decorated bracelets, earrings and hair rings, gold and silver scarabs, tools and semi-precious stones, as well as amulets and food. In contrast, children's graves and burials in the disused round silos only occasionally included grave goods.

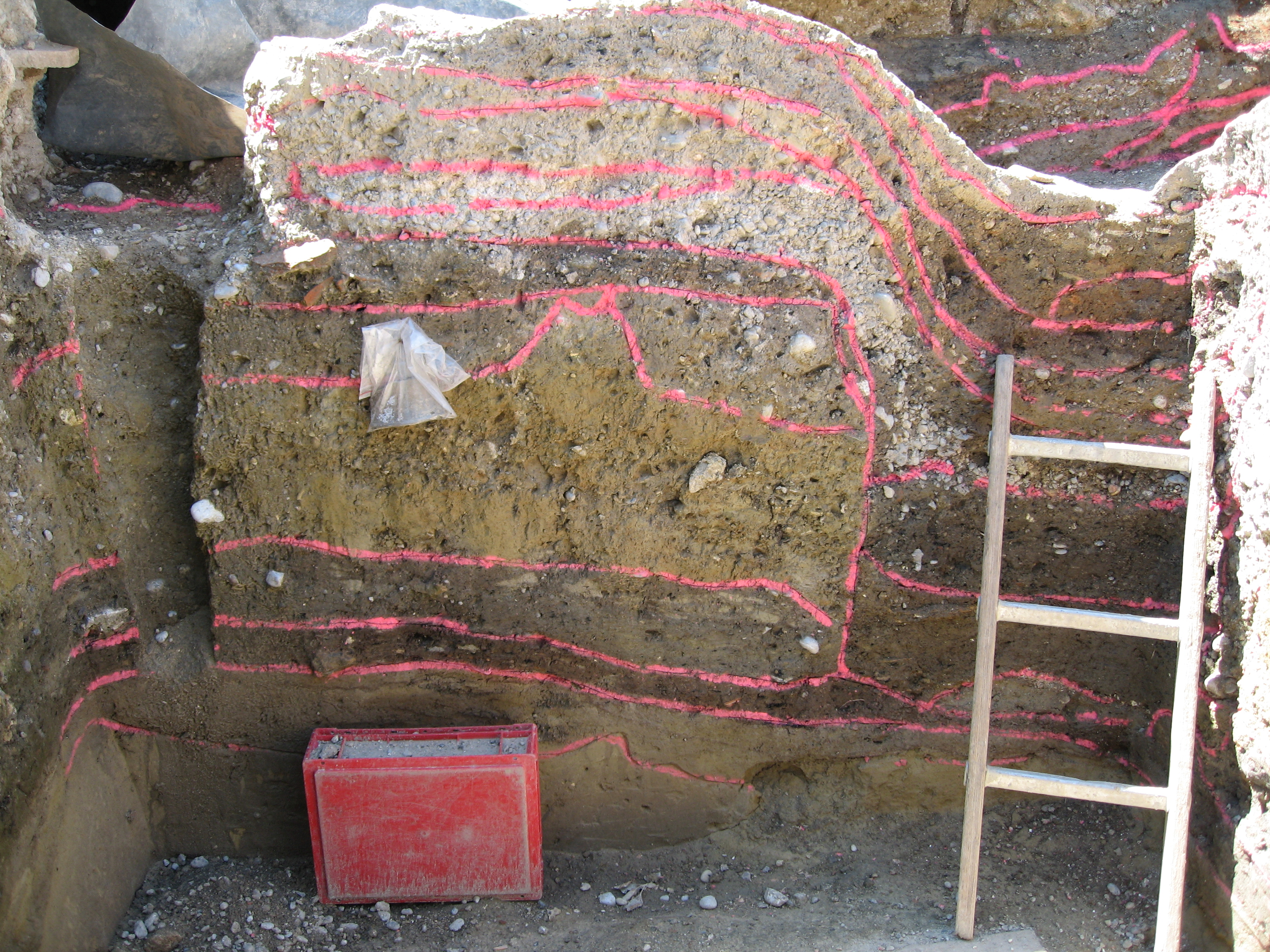
Archaeological excavation profile showing recognizable strata.

Based on the palaeobotanical analysis of the finds, the archaeological team of the Wadi Tumilat project concluded that Tell el-Maschuta fulfilled all the criteria of an urban settlement, but was only inhabited seasonally from the beginning of the sowing season in autumn until the end of the summer wheat harvest in spring. Due to these characteristics, Tell el-Maschuta had the character of a caravan station that was set up for long-distance trade. During the hot summer months, Tell el-Maschuta remained uninhabited. During this period, the inhabitants probably settled in the vicinity of Tell er-Retaba, where residential camps existed in the Middle Bronze Age. The materials used for the construction of Tell el-Maschuta show parallels to the finds in strata E1 to D3 of Avaris. Dwellings were built closer and closer together. The extent of agriculture, primarily the cultivation of wheat and barley to supply the inhabitants, increased considerably. Cattle, sheep, goats and pigs were also kept. Horse breeding was also already known. Other activities of the inhabitants included hunting several species of birds, hartebeest and gazelles.

The workers employed in agriculture were also used for other activities, such as pottery and the production of bronze tools. They also used looms, made clothing and used sickles with prefabricated blades. The exact purpose of the high-temperature ovens found during the excavations is unclear. Ochre-colored piles were driven into the ground in an industrial-like process. It is possible that the ovens were used for the production of leather with metal fittings as well as anvils or grinding tools. The final examination of the pottery found revealed that after the expulsion of the Hyksos by Kamose and Ahmose I, the settlement fell into disrepair and remained uninhabited for at least the period from the New Kingdom to the end of the Third Intermediate Period (1550 to 652 B.C.).

=== Second colonization phase ===
==== Saite dynasty from Necho II onwards (610-525 BC) ====
Tell el-Maschuta was not re-founded until the end of the 7th century BC, not far from Tell er-Retaba. During this time, Necho II ordered the construction of the Bubastis Canal between 610 and 605 BC in order to connect the Pelusian branch of the Nile with the Red Sea. The new canal led through the Wadi Tumilat and was expected to bring Egypt strategic and agricultural advantages.

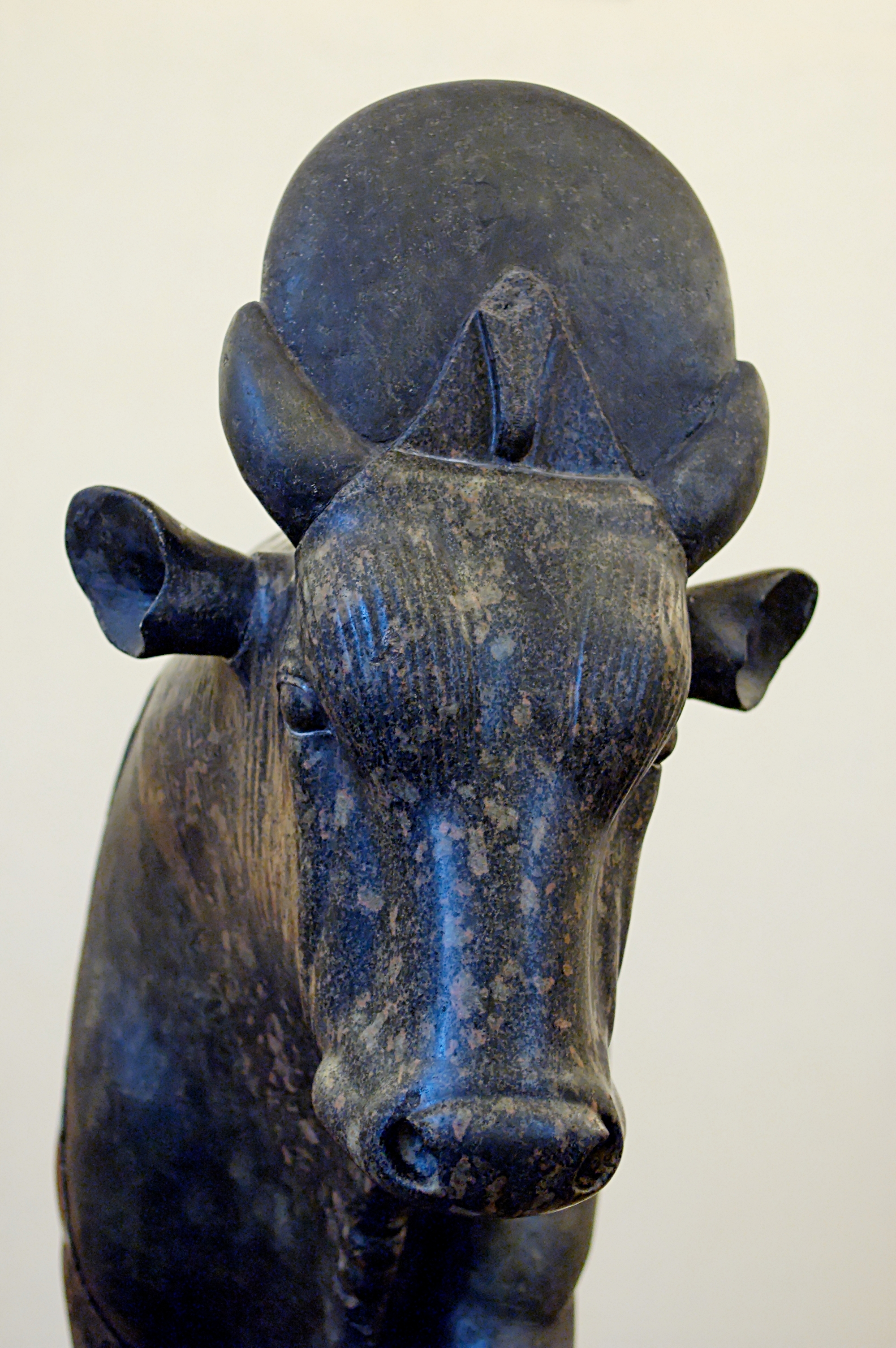
Representation of an Apis bull

The newly constructed site of Tell el-Maschuta initially served as a camp for the workers involved in the construction of the canal. A short time later, Apis bulls were sacrificed there and facilities were built for what would later become the Temple of Atum. Houses, barns and ovens were built to the north of the temple. In the midst of this construction phase, sudden changes are recognizable, probably due to Nechos' defeat at Carchemish in 605 BC and the loss of his territories in Retjenu. Shortly afterwards, a fortification wall about nine meters wide was erected around Tell el-Maschuta, enclosing an area of 200 m × 200 m. Settlement nevertheless came to a halt, as the protected area was not used for further construction of houses during the Saite dynasty.

The community on an area of four hectares was destroyed in 601 BC and then a second time 15 years later. Prior to this, the Egyptian Pharaoh Apries, in alliance with Zedekiah, had failed in his attempt to prevent the capture of Jerusalem by Nebuchadnezzar II. The devastation can therefore be attributed to the Babylonian king. Two pieces of Jewish pottery from 568 BC were found in Tell el-Maschuta, which testify to the presence of Jewish refugees in Tell el-Maschuta around 582 BC. Larger quantities of similar pottery turned up at Tahpanhes, located about 22 km from the mouth of the Pelusian Nile River, and at a site in the western Sinai region tentatively identified as Migdol.

After the destruction and reconstruction, Tell el-Maschuta developed into a highly frequented trading center during the Saite dynasty under the pharaohs Apries, Amasis and Psamtik III. The reason for this may have been the central location between the Mediterranean and Red Sea as well as the trade connection to the Indian Ocean, especially as Tell-el-Mashuta was also roughly halfway between Suez and Bubastis. The archaeological evidence of large quantities of Phoenician trade goods is consistent with Herodotus' statement that numerous Phoenicians settled in a "Phoenician camp near Memphis" during the reign of Apries:

"Then the kingdom came to a man in Memphis, whose name was Proteus in the language of the Hellenes. He now has a sanctuary in Memphis, which is very beautiful and well furnished and is situated towards the south of the temple of Hephaestus. The Phoenicians of Tyre live around this sanctuary and this whole place is called the 'camp of the Tyrians'." Herodotus, Histories, 2nd book, 112

Phoenician trade, which took on increasing proportions through the use of the Bubastis Canal, is documented by numerous finds of Phoenician amphorae in Tell el-Maschuta. The amphorae were used as storage containers for trade goods. Further evidence is provided by a terracotta statue found in the ruins of a limestone shrine, which probably represents Tanit or Asherah as a seated goddess. Greek amphorae were represented in smaller numbers, mostly from Thasos or Chios. There were also imported thick-walled mortars and the accompanying pestles, probably of Anatolian origin.

==== First Persian dynasty from Cambyses onwards (525-404 BC) ====
The conquest of Egypt in 525 BC by Cambyses II was accompanied by the renewed destruction of Tell el-Maschuta at the Battle of Pelusium. Subsequent reconstruction work at the site is well documented. The settlement area, which had already been extended during the Saite dynasty, was used for new buildings during the Persian period with an expansion in the south-western area. In the northern part of Tell el-Maschuta, there is evidence of an area that served as a necropolis south of the temple district in the Persian period from the end of the 6th century BC to around 404 BC at the Bubastis Canal.

After his ascension to power, Darius I extended the Bubastis Canal to a total length of 84 kilometers. Darius I had his achievements inscribed on four large stelae, the first of which was located in Tell el-Maschuta, in Egyptian, Old Persian, Elamite and Akkadian. In the course of the Egyptian rebellion against the Persians, which began in 487 BC, another stone wall was built outside the city wall of Tell el-Maschuta, which was filled with rubble, pottery and other materials. The archaeological findings provide evidence of the battles for Tell el-Maschuta associated with the rebellion. In the period that followed, warehouses were again erected throughout the area. After the Persians were driven out of Egypt in 404 BC, the strata were uninhabited until around 379 BC.

==== The last independent ancient Egyptian dynasty (379-341 BC) ====
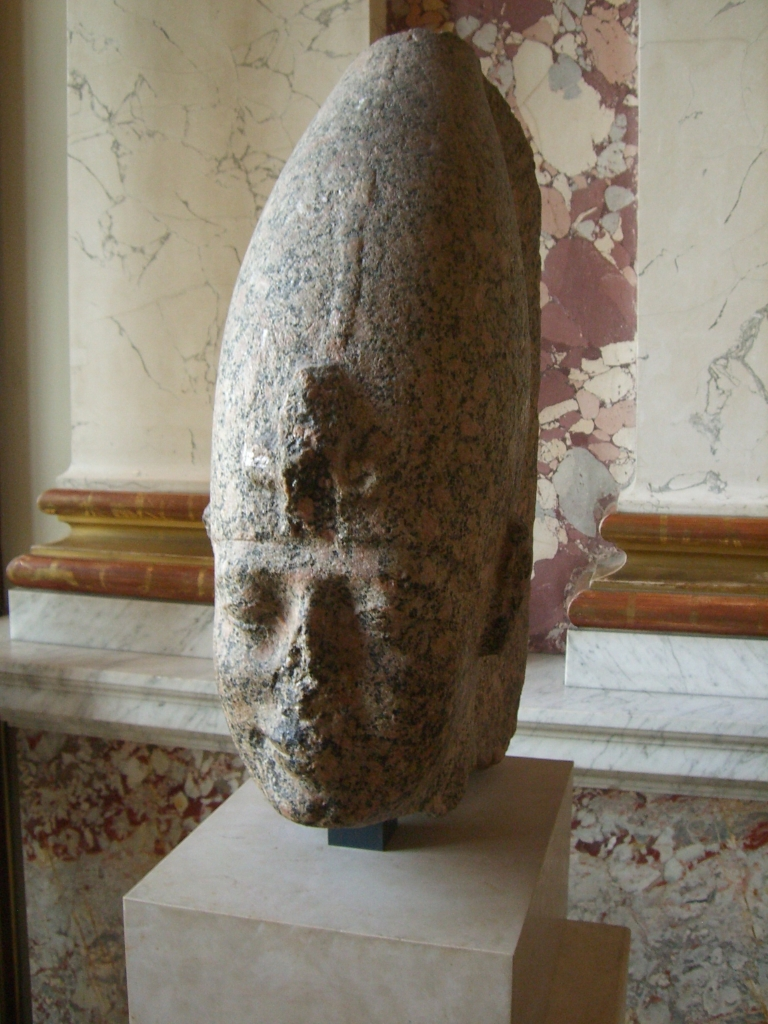
Head of a statue of Nectanebo I; Louvre, Paris

Fragments of monuments from the 30th Dynasty are evidence of the enormous building program of the pharaohs Nectanebo I and Nectanebo II, who also brought about a short-term "renaissance" for Tell el-Maschuta by promoting the ancient Egyptian religion. With the recolonization, trade and the import of goods increased dramatically during the 30th Dynasty, although the Bubastis Canal slowly dried up.

The trade revived by the Phoenicians focused mainly on wine, olive oil, fish sauces and other durable foods. More distant regions such as Thasos, Chios and Anatolia also took part in the exchange of goods, as did Arabia and Athens in particular. The temple cult of the Egyptian god Atum experienced a new heyday, as evidenced by the cuboid altars made with South Arabian influence. The existing ink inscriptions on glass fragments were mostly written in demotic script. The use of incense, which was also imported from southern Arabia, is documented as part of the sacrificial acts for the temple of Atum.

The accidental discovery of a storehouse containing thousands of Athenian tetradrachms caused quite a commotion. The unusually large sum indicates that they were donated as gifts to the temple of Atum. In addition, four bowls were discovered whose style and design suggest a Persian origin and probably came to Tell el-Maschuta via southern Arabia. All four bowls bore similar inscriptions, with one of the bowls bearing the Aramaic entry "That which Qaynu, son of Geshem, king of Qedar, offered for Han-'Ilat". This Geshem may be identical to the figure of the same name in the Book of Nehemiah in the Old Testament. The inscriptions on the bowls and additional silver coins found, which show the owl of Athena on their reverse, are dated to the transition from the fifth to the fourth century BC. The end of the 31st dynasty, which was replaced by Alexander's conquest of Egypt, led to an exodus of the inhabitants of Tell el-Maschuta, followed by a period without settlement until around 285 BC.

==== Reconstruction of the temple of Atum and construction of trading houses (285 BC to 1st century BC) ====
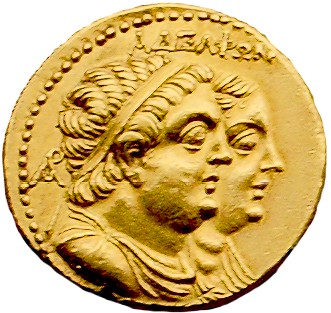
Octadrachmon: Portrait of Ptolemy II and Arsinoe II.(Pergamon Museum, Berlin)

After his reign began, Pharaoh Ptolemy II (285 to 246 BC) began to desilt and renovate the Bubastis Canal, which was associated with a modernization programme for Tell el-Maschuta. As a result of the extensive construction work, the site once again developed into an important trading post. Ptolemy II had his project inscribed and celebrated on a stele that he erected in Tell el-Maschuta.

Numerous large limestone blocks from other places in Egypt were transported to Tell el-Maschuta for the reconstruction of the Atum temple. A two-room building from the Persian period, which had already fallen into disrepair, was used as a pottery after reconstruction. In addition, probably towards the end of the reign of Ptolemy II, there were up to six-room granaries or multi-room warehouses on the banks of the Bubastis Canal. Several furnaces for the production of bronze goods for the Atum temple and for export were connected to these.

The trading houses and warehouses discovered by Édouard Naville and assigned to the "Children of Israel" probably date from the early days of the construction program under Ptolemy II, as only these were located in the immediate vicinity of the smelting furnaces on the banks of the Bubastis Canal. Ptolemy III (246 to 222 BC) and his successors must have initiated further extensive construction of trading houses and workshops, as the Wadi Tumilat project was only able to excavate a small number of the numerous trading houses, some of which were up to 75 m long, during its campaigns. The trading houses explored so far could be dated to the period between the second half of the 3rd century BC and around 125 BC. After the end of Ptolemaic rule, Tell el-Maschuta experienced a decline, so that the site lost its main function as a trading post at the beginning of the 1st century BC and was therefore once again abandoned by its inhabitants.

==== Tell el-Maschuta as a Roman necropolis ====
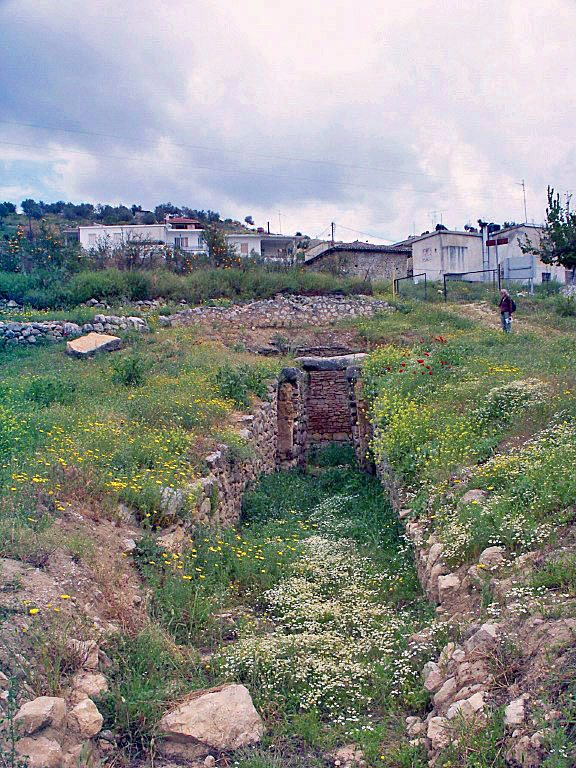
Example of dromos from Dendra

After the inhabitants left Tell el-Maschuta at the beginning of the 1st century BC, the site fell into disrepair. The site remained unused until the beginning of the 2nd century AD. When Trajan expanded the Bubastis Canal again after his reign, the region of Tell el-Maschuta functioned as a Roman necropolis and underwent the largest expansion in terms of area since its foundation under the Hyksos. There was no new settlement, however, as numerous tombs were erected on the ruins of the former trading center. Previous smaller excavation campaigns had already partially uncovered the Roman cemetery, which is why the archaeological team from Toronto did not carry out any further intensive investigations at this site, but was able to confirm the large quantities of pottery found in the upper stratum.

The findings revealed that the necropolis was mostly built for "privileged Roman citizens" and consisted of square underground tombs with vaulted superstructures. These mud-brick tombs also had an access path or walled dromos, which allowed access to the burial chambers on the eastern side of the tombs. The vaulted burial passages, which only had a simple access path, were walled up after each burial. The relatives of the grave owner, on the other hand, filled the dromos with sand. Gold-plated figurines of gods, earrings, glass vessels and hairpins made of bone were used as grave goods. Some of the valuable grave goods in the tombs were already looted during their active use as a necropolis.

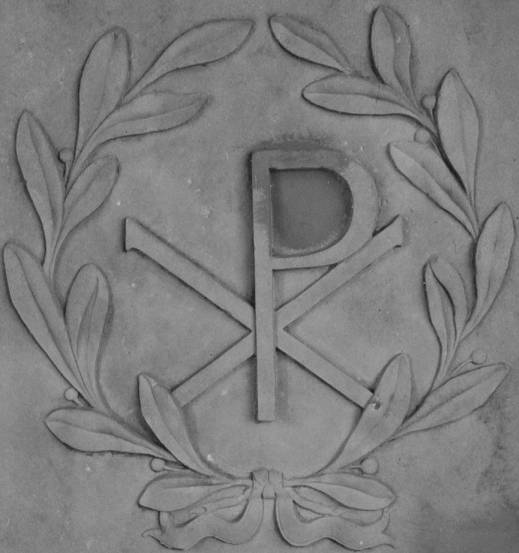
Chi-Rho symbols as Christ monogram

There were also simple burials that were embedded in the open space between the mud-brick tombs without any special additions of statuettes of gods. Most of the burials exhibited the typical forms of Roman style, which can also be seen in the symbolic orientation of the graves. The necropolis also had a burial area for children. A Christian child burial is noteworthy in this context. In the upper part of an amphora from Gaza there was a Coptic inscription with two "Chi-Rho symbols" as Christ's monogram, which had been used by Christians since the 2nd century AD to represent their faith and to recognize each other. However, this form of burial was only found on very few burial objects.

In the early 4th century AD, Tell el-Maschuta was abandoned as a Roman necropolis, as evidenced by the absence of the decorated grave illuminations. Around 381 AD, the existence of a Roman "garrison of heroes" stationed in the region of Tell el-Maschuta is attested, but at this time it was located in Abu Suwerr, only about two kilometers away, which retained its military function and is now home to a military air base.

== Identifications with the biblical Pithom or Sukkot ==
For some time now, there have been controversial discussions about the question of whether Tell el-Maschutah should be identified with the Old Testament Pithom or Sukkot. Édouard Naville believed that his excavation findings confirmed his assumption that it was the "children of Israel" who built the "trading houses" at Tell el-Maschutah. Kenneth Anderson Kitchen, on the other hand, considers Tell el-Maschutah to be the biblical Sukkot, where the Israelites camped on their exodus from Egypt. Kitchen still stands by his hypothesis that both Tell er-Retaba and Tell el-Maschuta coexisted as settlements in the New Kingdom, without, however, taking into account the pottery findings of John S. Holladay's archaeological team. Donald B. Redford, on the other hand, agreed with Holladay's findings and sees Tell el-Maschuta as the biblical Pithom, which was only built 600 years after the Exodus from Egypt.

Recent research has questioned Holladay's conclusion that Tell el-Maschuta was unoccupied in the New Kingdom period, however. In 2010, archaeologists at the site found the remains of a large burial chamber of the Ramesside official Ken-Amun. James K. Hoffmeier and Gary Rendsburg argue that the discovery of such large burial complex implies that there must have been a community dwelling at Tell el-Maschuta during the 19th Dynasty. They also note that Holladay's excavation was confined to the southern parts of the tell while the tomb was found in a more northern area, suggesting that the later part was the location of Tjeku (Biblical Sukkot).

The references to Sukkot in the Pentateuch (Ex 12:37, Num 33:5-6) remain unclear and leave open whether it is a city, a village, a fort or a region. The "building of the city of Pitom" mentioned in Exodus 1:11 is also difficult to reconcile with the past of Tell el-Maschuta. In light of the excavations, those historians who identified Pithom with Tell el-Maschuta judged the story of the Exodus from Egypt to be fiction or saw it as an anachronistic additional account that was only included in the scriptures around the 6th century BC.

Detailed examinations of the ancient Egyptian papyri show that the Egyptian name Tjeku (which derives from the Hebrew equivalent Sukkot), almost always referred to a larger area in the 19th and 20th dynasties and was only written once with the city determinative. "Per Tem" or "Pi-Tem" as an ancient Egyptian term for "House of Tem" referred to a temple of the god that "lay in Tjeku". This means that there is no longer any basis for a fixed place name for "Pithom" as the "House of Tem". For these reasons, Alan Gardiner had already spoken out long ago against equating Tell el-Maschuta with Pithom or Sukkot. Since the excavation findings may prove that Tell el-Maschuta no longer existed during the Ramesside period, the ancient Egyptian papyri reports cannot have referred to Tell el-Maschuta and must therefore refer to a different place. Some of the monuments and statues found in Tell el-Maschuta date either to the 9th century BC or to the Ramesside period. This finding, as well as the other excavation results, prove that Tell el-Maschuta can therefore be ruled out as the "site of the Exodus from Egypt" or as the "Pithom near Pi-Ramesses".

== Bibliography ==
- Bonnet, Hans (2000). "Pithom". Lexikon der ägyptischen Religionsgeschichte (in German). Hamburg: Nikol. p. 596. ISBN 3937872086.
- Dumbrell, William J. (1971). "The Tell-el-Maskhuta Bowls and the "Kingdom" of Qedar in the Persian Period". Bulletin of the American Schools of Oriental Research. 203. American Schools of Oriental Research. Baltimore: 33–44. doi:10.2307/1356289. JSTOR 1356289.
- Hoffmeier, James K. (2005). Ancient Israel in Sinai. The Evidence for the Authenticity of the Wilderness Tradition. New York: Oxford University Press. ISBN 0195155467.
- Holladay, John S. (2001). Redford, Donald B. (ed.). Pithom. The Oxford encyclopedia of ancient Egypt. Vol. 3 P-Z. Oxford: Oxford University Press. pp. 50–53. ISBN 0195138236.
- Holladay, John S. (1999). Bard, Kathryn A.; Blake Shubert, Steven (eds.). Tell el-Maskhuta. Encyclopedia of the archaeology of ancient Egypt. London: Routledge. pp. 786–789. ISBN 0415185890.
- Holladay, John S. (1982). Tell el-Maskhuta: Preliminary report on the Wadi Tumilat Project 1978–1979. Malibu: Undena Publications. ISBN 0890030847.
- Naville, Édouard (1888). The store-city of Pithom and The route of the Exodus. London: Trübner (published 1903).
- Oren, Eliezer (1984). "A new fortress on the edge of Eastern Nile Delta". Bulletin of the American Schools of Oriental Research. 256. American Schools of Oriental Research. Baltimore: 7–44. doi:10.2307/1356923. JSTOR 1356923.
- Paice, Patricia (1987). "A preliminary Analysis of some Elements of the Saite and Persian period pottery at Tell el-Maskhuta". Bulletin of the Egyptological Seminar (BES). 8. New York: 95–107.
- van Seters, John (2001). "The Geography of the Exodus". In Dearman, John Andrew (ed.). The land that I will show you: Essays on the History and Archaeology of the Ancient near East in Honour of J. Maxwell Miller. Sheffield: Sheffield Academic Press. pp. 255–276. ISBN 1841272574.
