= Saft el-Hinna =

Archaeological site in Egypt

Saft el-Hinna صفط الحنة
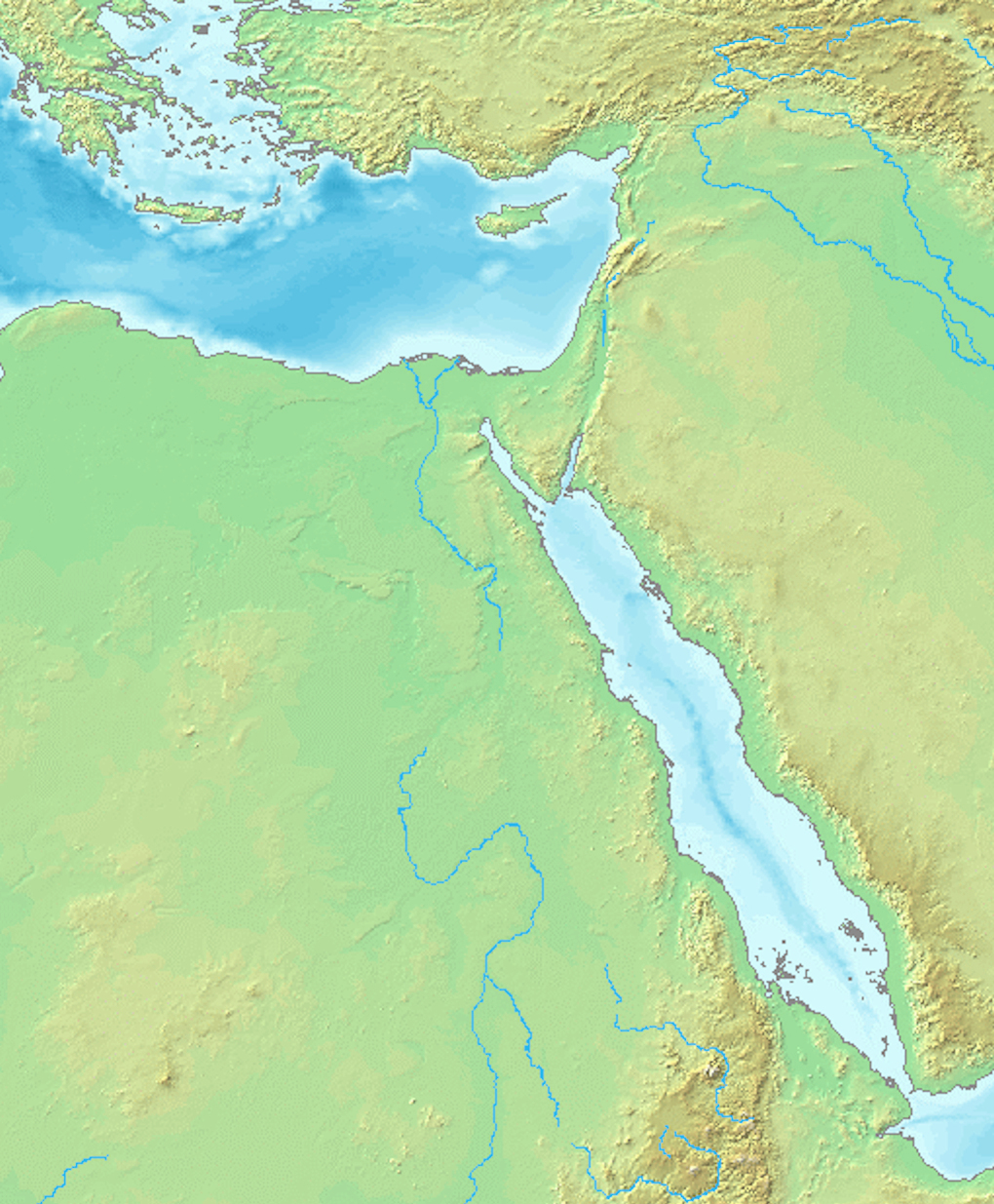
- Location in Egypt Saft el-Hinna (Egypt) Saft el-Hinna (Northeast Africa)
- Coordinates: 30°33′20″N 31°36′35″E
- Country: Egypt
- Governorate: Sharqia
- Time zone: UTC+2 (EST)

Saft el-Hinna (Arabic: صفط الحنا, romanized: Ṣafṭ al-Ḥinnā), also written as Saft el-Hinneh, Saft el-Henna, Saft el-Henneh, is a village and an archaeological site in Egypt. It is located in the modern Al Sharqia Governorate, in the Nile Delta, about 7 km southeast of Zagazig.

The 1885 Census of Egypt recorded Saft el-Hinna as a nahiyah in the district of Bilbeis in Sharqia Governorate; at that time, the population of the town was 664 (306 men and 358 women).

== Name ==
M44 G11 t niwt
spd(t)
in hieroglyphs
Era: Ptolemaic dynasty
(305–30 BC)

pr Z1 s b d M44 or pr Z1 M44 G13 niwt
pr spd
in hieroglyphs
Era: Late Period
(664–332 BC)

The modern village of Saft el-Hinna lies on the ancient Egyptian town of Per-Sopdu or Pi-Sopt, meaning "House of Sopdu", which was the capital of the 20th nome of Lower Egypt and one of the most important cult centers during the Late Period of ancient Egypt. As the ancient name implies, the town was consecrated to Sopdu, god of the eastern borders of Egypt.

During the late Third Intermediate Period, Per-Sopdu – called Pishaptu or Pisapti, in Akkadian, by the Neo-Assyrian invaders – was the seat of one of the four Great chiefdom of the Meshwesh, along with Mendes, Sebennytos and Busiris.

The medieval name of the city was Tiarabya (Coptic: ϯⲁⲣⲁⲃⲓⲁ, Arabic: طرابية) as it was a major city in the eastern part of the Nile Delta which bore the same name.

== Excavations ==
In December 1884, Swiss Egyptologist Édouard Naville was performing a survey in the Wadi Tumilat on behalf of the Egypt Exploration Fund. He went to Saft el-Hinna, a village of hinna farmers, and there he found traces of the ancient city under the modern settlement. He believed he had found the ancient city of Phacusa in the Biblical Land of Goshen, although it is nowadays assumed that Phacusa lies under the modern town of Faqus. Even though the archaeological site was threatened by urban development and the expansion of crops, Naville managed to discover several monuments of pharaoh Nectanebo I of the 30th Dynasty, the perimeter walls of a temple, and other attestations dating to the Ptolemaic and Roman periods. Unfortunately, he never published a comprehensive excavation report.

Among the findings dated to Nectanebo I, Naville found a naos dedicated to Sopdu. It was later discovered that the naos was one of four that were meant to be in the temple whose walls were found by Naville under Saft el-Hinna. The other three naoi were discovered as well, though in other places in the Delta and not in situ. One was dedicated to Shu; parts of it were found at Abukir and it is called the Naos of the Decades. Another was dedicated to Tefnut, and a poorly preserved one was discovered at Arish. All but the last one (due to its poor conservation) are thought to be attributable to Nectanebo I.

In 1906, Flinders Petrie went to Saft el-Hinna to conduct an excavation aimed at discovering evidence of a Hebrew presence in ancient Egypt. He soon found that the condition of the site was even worse than at the time of Naville. He decided to dig in two undisturbed neighboring areas, Kafr Sheikh Zikr and Suwa, which turned out to be two ancient necropolises of Per-Sopdu. However, like Naville before him, Petrie never published a comprehensive report of these excavations.

Saft el-Hinna was later involved in two surface surveys, the Wadi Tumilat Project begun in 1977, and the Liverpool University Delta Survey (1983–85). The latter was led by Steven Snape, who commented that of the ruins described by Naville a century earlier, almost nothing was left.

By combining archaeological and philological evidence, it is now known that the sacred area of Per-Sopdu was divided into two parts, called Hut-nebes and Iat-nebes, which were connected by a dromos.

== Gallery ==
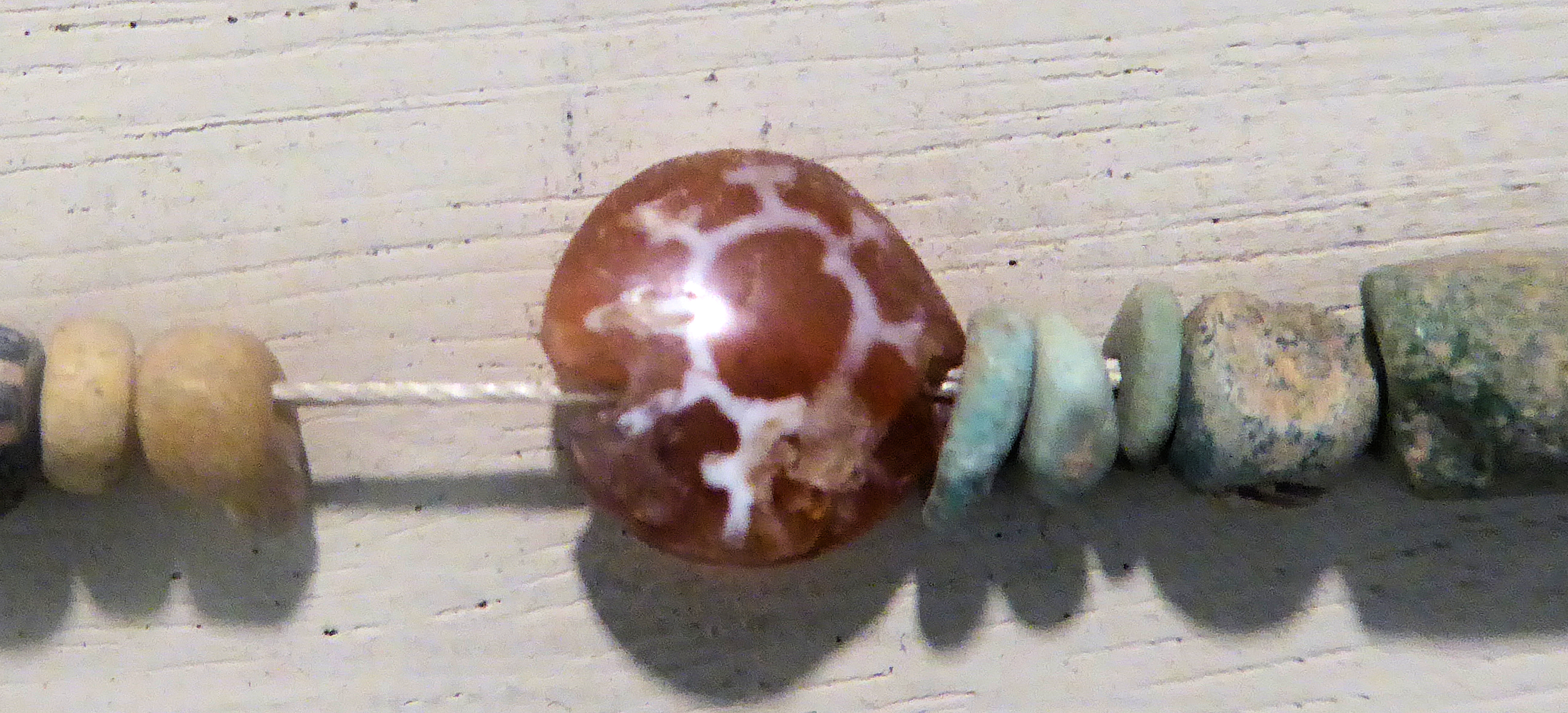
Characteristic Indian etched carnelian bead, found in Ptolemaic Period excavations at Saft el-Hinna, Ptolemaic Egypt. Petrie Museum.

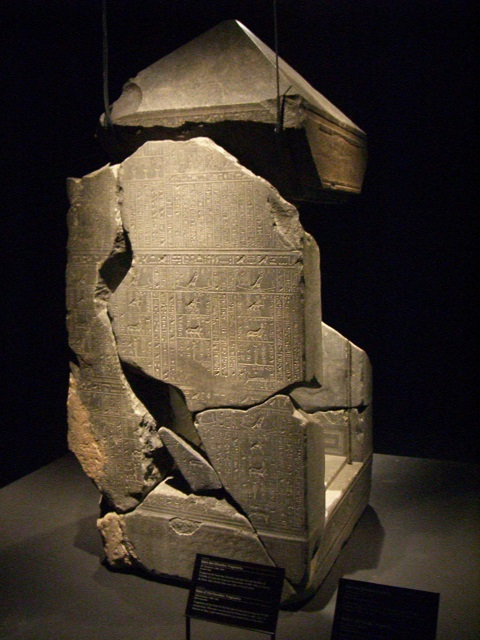
The reassembled “Naos of the Decades”, originally placed in the temple at Saft el-Hinna.

== See also ==
- List of ancient Egyptian sites, including sites of temples

== Bibliography ==
- Kitchen, Kenneth (1996). The Third Intermediate Period in Egypt (1100–650 BC) (3rd ed.). Warminster: Aris & Phillips Limited. ISBN 0-85668-298-5.
- Naville, Édouard (1887). The shrine of Saft el Henneh and the land of Goshen (1885). London: The Egypt Exploration Fund. pp. 1–13.
- Shaw, Ian; Nicholson, Paul (1995). The British Museum Dictionary of Ancient Egypt. The American University in Cairo Press. p. 276.
- Tiribilli, Elena (2012). "Una ricostruzione topografica del distretto templare di Saft el-Henna tra filologia e archeologia". Egitto e Vicino Oriente (in Italian). 35: 125–142.
