= Pr (hieroglyph) =

Egyptian hieroglyph

pr
House
(" floor plan" )
in hieroglyphs

Pr (𓉐 Gardiner sign listed no. O1) is the hieroglyph for 'house', the floor-plan of a walled building with an open doorway.

While its original pronunciation is not known with certainty, modern Egyptology assigns it the value of per, but purely on the basis of a convention specific to the discipline. However, the Ancient Greek rendering of the title pr-`3 as Ancient Greek: φαραώ pharaō suggests the reconstruction of the historical (Late Egyptian) pronunciation as *par, see Pharaoh#Etymology.

pr anx pr
House of Life
"library"
in hieroglyphs

Pr combined with an associated "personal name", god, or location becomes the "house of .... ." An example for pharaoh Setnakhte is the city of: Pr-Atum, (city of Pithom). Pr and ankh-(life) is a "combination hieroglyph" and is the "word" for house of life. The "house of life" is a library for papyrus books-(scrolls), as well as a possible scriptorium.

The shape of pr in beginning dynasties had variations in the shape of a square, with the opening. See Garrett Reference for tomb of Official Ti.

Pr is one of hieroglyphs adopted into the Proto-Sinaitic script, the earliest known alphabetic writing system. It was used to represent the phoneme /b/ as in bayt, the Canaanite word for "house", after the hieroglyph's original meaning. The Latin letter B is a distant descendant of this letter.

== "Pr-name" /associations ==
- pr-aa– Pharaoh
- pa-pr-aa– Papyrus
- Pr-Ab– Thoth
- Per-Amun– Pelusium
- Pr-Aat– Heliopolis
- Pr-Atum– House of Atum: Heliopolis
- Pr-Atum– Setnakhte
- Pr-Banebdjedet– Mendes
- Pr-Bast– House of Bast: Bubastis
- Pr-Bastet– Zagazig
- Pr-Djet– a type of early Egyptian tomb
- Pr-Hai– Malqata
- Pr-Hay– Amenhotep III
- Pr-Hay– Great Temple of the Aten
- Pr-Hathor– Aphroditopolis
- Pr-Hedj– Treasury (House of Silver)
- Pr-Medjat– Library
- Pr-Nebu– Treasury (House of Gold)
- Pr-Nebyt– Ramesses V
- Pr-Nemty– Hieracon
- Pr-Ramesses– Avaris, History of ancient Egypt
- Pr-Sekhemkheperre– Osorkon I
- Pr-Sopdu– Sopdu
- Pr-t– Season of the Emergence
- Pr-Temu Tjeku– Necho II
- Pr-Wadjet– Buto, Wadjet
- Pr-Yinepu– Anubis

== See also ==
- List of Egyptian hieroglyphs
- Pr-Bast
- Pr-Medjed
- Pr-Nemty
- Pr-Wadjet
- Pi-Ramesses
- Pi-Sekhemkheperre
- Per-Sopdu
- Egyptian biliteral signs
- The dictionary definition of Bet (letter) at Wiktionary

== Notes ==
- The Per Ankh was also known as "The House of Life."It was made by Thoth, the Egyptian god.
