= Land of Goshen =

Place in Egypt given to the Hebrews by the pharaoh of Joseph

Coordinates: 30°52′20″N 31°28′39″E

The land of Goshen (Hebrew: אֶרֶץ גֹּשֶׁן, ʾEreṣ Gōšen) is mentioned in the Hebrew Bible as the area in Egypt that was allotted to the Hebrews by the Pharaoh during the time of Joseph (Book of Genesis, Genesis 45:9–10). They dwelt in Goshen up until the time of the Exodus, when they left Egypt. It is believed to have been located in the eastern Nile Delta, lower Egypt; perhaps at or near Avaris, the seat of power of the Hyksos kings.

== Biblical text ==
The land of Goshen is mentioned in the biblical books of Genesis and Exodus. In the story of Joseph, which comprises the final chapters of Genesis, the patriarch Jacob is facing famine and sends ten of his sons to Egypt to buy grain. Joseph, another of Jacob's sons, is a high official in Egypt and allows his father and brothers to settle in Egypt. In Genesis 45:10, Goshen is treated as being close to Joseph, who lives at the pharaoh's court and in Genesis 47:5 Goshen is called "the best part" of the land of Egypt. But it is also implied to be somewhat set apart from the rest of Egypt, because Joseph tells his family to present themselves to the pharaoh as keepers of livestock, "in order that you may settle in the land of Goshen, because all shepherds are abhorrent to the Egyptians." Genesis 47:11 interchanges the "land of Ramesses" with Goshen: "Joseph settled his father and his brothers and granted them a holding in the land of Egypt, in the best part of the land, in the land of Ramesses, as Pharaoh had instructed."

In Exodus, Jacob's descendants, the Israelites, continue to live in Egypt and grow numerous. The name of Goshen appears only twice in Exodus, in the narration of the Plagues of Egypt, in which Goshen as the dwelling place of the Israelites is spared the plague of flies and plague of hail that afflict the Egyptians.

A place named Goshen is also mentioned in the Book of Joshua, where the Israelites are continuing with their conquest of the Promised Land. Joshua 11:16 states: "So Joshua took all that land: the hill country and all the Negeb and all the land of Goshen and the lowland and the Arabah and the hill country of Israel and its lowland." However, this Goshen is generally considered to refer to a region located in the east of Judah between the Negev and the Hill Country, rather than to the Egyptian Goshen.

== Etymology ==
Some Egyptologists have suggested a connection with the name gsm used in reference to a lake in Papyrus Anastasi IV, as the name appears to have been used as a toponym in the Wādī Ṭumīlāt. This name gsm is considered by some scholars to have been most probably a Semitic loanword, possibly deriving from the Semitic root gšm "rain, storm". Donald Redford, while not disputing the location of Goshen, gives a different origin for the name, deriving it from "Gasmu," the rulers of the Bedouin Qedarites who occupied the eastern Delta from the 7th century BCE, but John Van Seters thinks this unlikely. Mark Janzen argues that the lack of references to the Land of Goshen in biblical texts from the 6th century BCE or later makes Redford's proposal unlikely.

== Identification ==
Locations of Pithom, Raamses and On (Heliopolis) in northern Egypt

In 1885, Édouard Naville identified Goshen as the 20th nome of Egypt, located in the eastern Delta, and known as "Gesem" or "Kesem" during the Twenty-sixth dynasty of Egypt (672–525 BCE). It covered the western end of the Wadi Tumilat, the eastern end being the district of Succoth, which had Pithom as its main town, extended north as far as the ruins of Pi-Ramesses (the "land of Rameses"), and included both crop land and grazing land.

The scholars Isaac Rabinowitz, Israel Ephʿal, Jan Retsö, and David F. Graf identify the land of Goshen with the parts of the Qedarite kingdom of "Arabia" located to the east of the Nile Delta and around Pithom, and which became known to ancient Egyptians as Gsm (𓎤𓊃𓅓𓏏𓊖) and to Jews as the ʾEreṣ Gōšen (אֶרֶץ גֹּשֶׁן), that is the lit. 'Land of Gešem', after either the Qedarite king Gešem or after his dynasty. Although the scholar John Van Seters has opposed the identification of ʾEreṣ Gōšen with the Qedarite territories in eastern Egypt based on claims that the Qedarites never ruled the region of the Wādī Ṭumīlāt, the discovery in the Wādī Ṭumīlāt region of Qedarite remains, such as a shrine to the goddess al-Lāt, makes Van Seters's opposition to this identification untenable.

The scholars Sarah I. Groll, Manfred Bietak and Mark Janzen reject any connection between the Land of Goshen and the territories of the Qedarite king Gešem, proposing instead that the biblical placename is related to the lake gsm mentioned in Papyrus Anastasi IV. In their view, the biblical land should be identified with the western part of the Wādī Ṭumīlāt with its large overflow lake.

== General and cited references ==
- Bietak, Manfred (2015). "On the Historicity of the Exodus: What Egyptology Today Can Contribute to Assessing the Biblical Account of the Sojourn in Egypt". In Levy, Thomas E.; Schneider, Thomas; Propp, William H. C. (eds.). Israel's Exodus in Transdisciplinary Perspective: Text, Archaeology, Culture, and Geoscience. Springer. ISBN 978-3-319-04767-6.
- Ephʿal, Israel (1984). The Ancient Arabs: Nomads on the Borders of the Fertile Crescent, 9th-5th Centuries B.C. Jerusalem: Magnes Press. ISBN 978-0-685-74243-3.
- Grabbe, Lester (2014). "Exodus and History". In Dozeman, Thomas B.; Evans, Craig A.; Lohr, Joel N. (eds.). The Book of Exodus: Composition, Reception, and Interpretation. Brill. ISBN 978-90-04-28266-7.
- Graf, David F. (1997). "Palestine: Palestine in the Persian through Roman Periods". In Meyers, Eric M.; Dever, William G.; Meyers, Carol L.; Muhly, James D.; Pardee, Dennis; Sauer, James A.; Finney, Paul Corby; Jorgensen, John S. (eds.). The Oxford Encyclopedia of Archaeology in the Near East. Vol. 4. Oxford, United Kingdom; New York City, United States: Oxford University Press. pp. 222–228. ISBN 978-0-195-06512-1.
- Groll, Sarah I. (1998). "The Egyptian background of the Exodus and the crossing of the Reed Sea: A new reading of Papyrus Anastasi VIII". In Irene, Shirun-Grumach (ed.). Jerusalem Studies in Egyptology. Harrassowitz. ISBN 978-3-447-04085-3.
- Janzen, Mark D. (2024). "The Land of Goshen: A Socio-Spatial Analysis (Gen 45:10; 46:28–47:6; 47:27; 50:8; Exod 8:22; 9:26)". In Beitzel, Barry J. (ed.). Lexham Geographic Commentary on the Pentateuch. Lexham Press. pp. 341–352. ISBN 978-1-68359-729-2.
- Rabinowitz, Isaac (1956). "Aramaic Inscriptions of the Fifth Century B. C. E. from a North-Arab Shrine in Egypt". Journal of Near Eastern Studies. 15 (1). Chicago, United States: University of Chicago Press: 1–9. doi:10.1086/371302. JSTOR 542658. S2CID 161559065.
- Retsö, Jan (2013). The Arabs in Antiquity: Their History from the Assyrians to the Umayyads. London, United Kingdom; New York City, United States: Routledge. ISBN 978-1-136-87289-1.
- Theis, Christoffer (January 2020). "Goschen". Das wissenschaftliche Bibellexikon im Internet (WiBiLex) (in German). Stuttgart: Deutsche Bibelgesellschaft.
- Van Seters, John (2001). "The Geography of the Exodus". In Dearman, J. Andrew; Graham, M. Patrick (eds.). The Land that I Will Show You: Essays on the History and Archaeology of the Ancient Near East in Honor of J. Maxwell Miller. Journal for the Study of the Old Testament: Supplement Series. Vol. 343. Sheffield, United Kingdom: Sheffield Academic Press. pp. 255–276. ISBN 978-0-567-35580-5.
- Van Seters, John (2004). "The Joseph Story: Some Basic Observations". In Knoppers, Gary N.; Hirsch, Antoine (eds.). Egypt, Israel, and the Ancient Mediterranean World: Studies in Honor of Donald B. Redford. Brill. ISBN 978-90-04-13844-5.
