= Tell el-Kuʿ =

Archaeological site in Egypt

Coordinates: 30.5089°N 31.9101°E

Tell el-Kuʿ (Arabic تل الكوع), also written as Tell el-Ku'a and Tell el-Koa, is an archaeological site in Egypt, located in the eastern Nile Delta at the Wadi Tumilat. The excavated areas of the site were used at different times as a cemetery and a settlement. The finds from the site date mostly from the Second Intermediate Period, encompassing the period from the late Middle Kingdom to the early New Kingdom. The site exhibits burial practices of non-Egyptian origin, including donkey burials, attested at other eastern Delta sites during the period (such as Tell el-Dab'a, Tell Basta, Tell el-Yahudiya). The settlement architecture is comparable to that of the nearby site Tell el-Maskhuta. Along with other sites at the Wadi Tumilat, Tell el-Kuʿ is considered to be involved in trade contacts between Second Intermediate Period Egypt and the Levant.

The site was excavated in 1987 by Ibrahim M. Soleman, later by Nabil el-Sherif, M. Salem el-Hangury, Nasr Allah el-Kelany, and Soleman Mahmoud, and since 2018 by Aiman Ashmawy Ali.

== Tell el-Mansheya ==
Just 200 meters to the west of Tell el-Kuʿ lies another Second Intermediate Period archaeological site Tell el-Mansheya (Arabic تل المنشية) Salvage excavations conducted in 2015 revealed settlement remains and burials. It is considered to have been a hamlet or a satellite of the Tell el-Kuʿ settlement. Tell el-Mansheya burials are comparable to those from other Second Intermediate Period sites at Wadi Tumilat.
