= Phacusa =

Coordinates: 31.0500°N 32.6000°E

Phacusa (Ancient Greek: Φάκουσα and Φάκουσαι) was a city in the late Roman province of Augustamnica Prima. It served as a bishopric that was a suffragan of Pelusium, the metropolitan see of that province.

Ptolemy makes it the suffragan of the nomos of Arabia in Lower Egypt; Strabo places Phacusa at the beginning of the canal which empties into the Red Sea; it is described also by Peutinger's Table under the name of Phacussi, and by the Anonymous of Ravenna (130), under Phagusa.

Phacusa is identified widely with the modern Tell-Fakus; Heinrich Brugsch and Edouard Naville place it at Saft el-Hinna, about twelve miles from there.

== Bishops ==
In the list of the partisan bishops of Melitius present at the Council of Nicæa in 325 may be found Moses of Phacusa; he is the only known titular.
