= Ankhkherednefer =

- Great Inspector of the Palace, Good scribe of the Temple of Atum, Lord of Tura (Note: The god is reproduced in original with double crown and without scepter. In the inscription, the god Atum was also dubbed Lord of An (Tura). An could be identified archaeologically with the place Tura.), Supreme Lieutenant of the Pharaoh
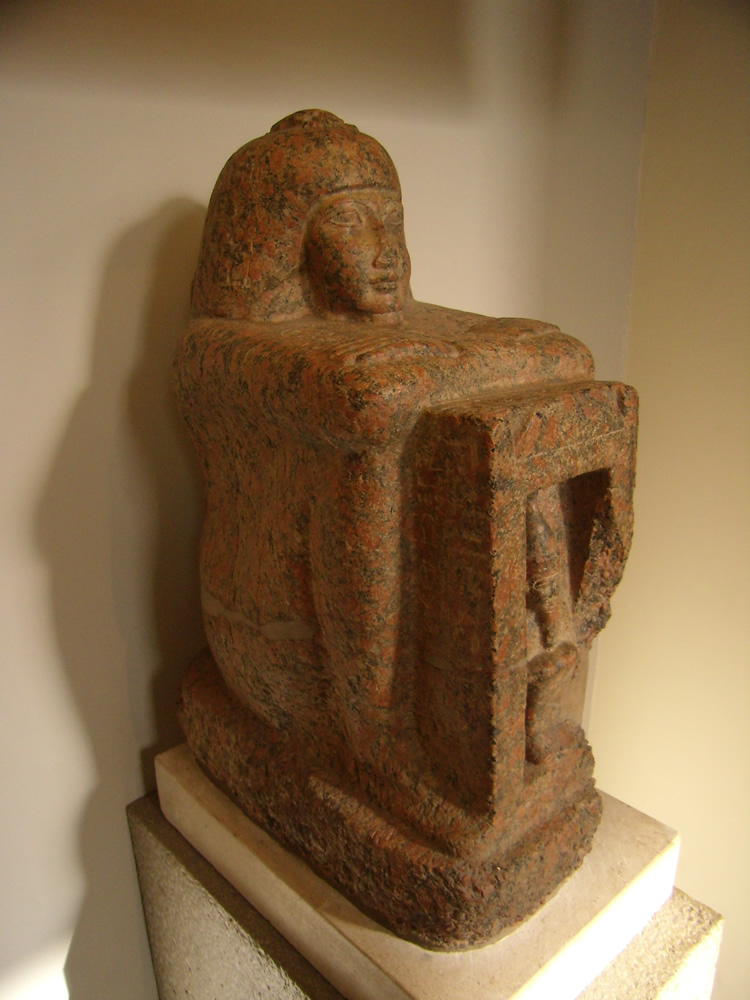
- Block statue of Ankhkherednefer
Egyptian name
anx Xrd nfr

Ankhkherednefer (Ancient Egyptian: ˁnḫ ẖrd nfr, lit. ''The beautiful child lives'') (name formerly read as Ankhrenepnefer, or Ankhsherynefer) was an ancient Egyptian official known from a block statue found in the Tell el-Maskhuta (perhaps ancient Pithom). The statue, made of red granite is now in the British Museum (BM 1007).

== Biography ==
Ankhkherednefer served under king Osorkon II whose name appears on the statue. On the statue he bears the titles: Great Inspector of the Palace; Good scribe of the Temple of Atum, Lord of Tura and Supreme Lieutenant of the Pharaoh.

== Literature ==
- Edouard Naville: The Store-city of Pithom and the Route of the Exodus, London, 1885, S. 13-14 with English translations of the texts, Frontispice, Text on plate IV). online
- Karl Jansen-Winkeln: Ägyptische Biographien der 22. und 23. Dynasstie, Teil 1, Wiesbaden 1985, S. 269-71 ISBN 3-447-02525-5
- Karl Jansen-Winkeln: Inschriften der Spätzeit, Bd. II: Die 22.-24. Dynastie, Wiesbaden, 2007, S. 126-127
