= Marguerite Naville =

Swiss artist, photographer and diarist (1852–1930)

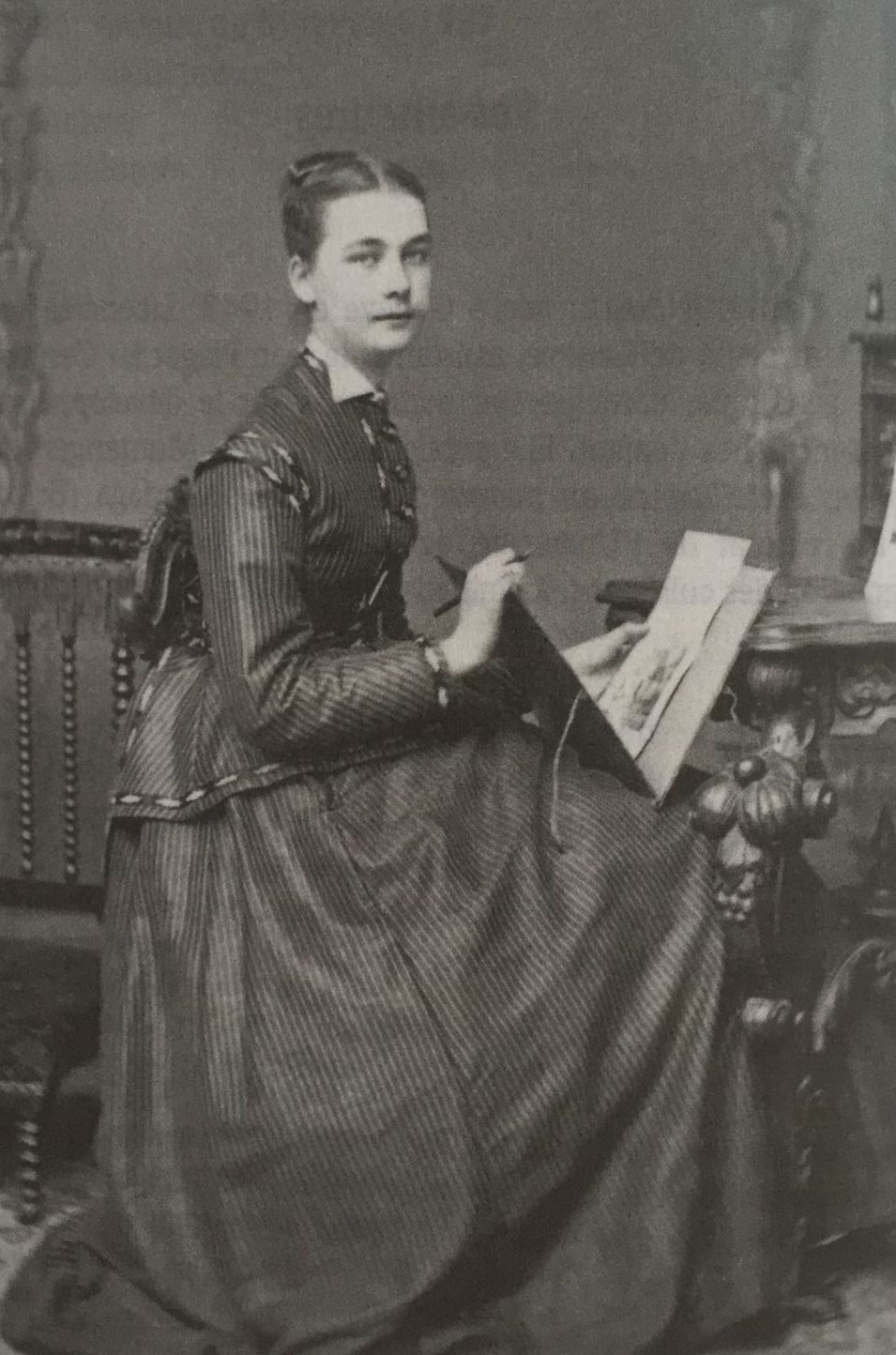
Marguerite Naville

Marguerite-Isabelle Naville (née de Pourtalès; 14 August 1852 – 14 December 1930) was a Swiss artist, photographer and writer. After marrying the Egyptologist Édouard Naville in 1873, she accompanied him on 14 archaeological trips to Egypt, meticulously recording his finds in photographs and drawings. Her extensive diaries and correspondence provide detailed descriptions of life in Egypt at the turn of the 20th century.

== Biography ==
Born on 14 August 1852 in Versoix, Canton of Geneva, Isabelle-Marguerite de Pourtalès was the daughter of Alexandre Joseph de Pourtalès (1810–1883), a Prussian count and artillery officer, and his wife Augusta Marie Élisabeth née Saladin (1815–1885). She was influenced by her family's allegiance to the Germans during the Franco-Prussian War in 1870 but went on to support the French during the First World War.

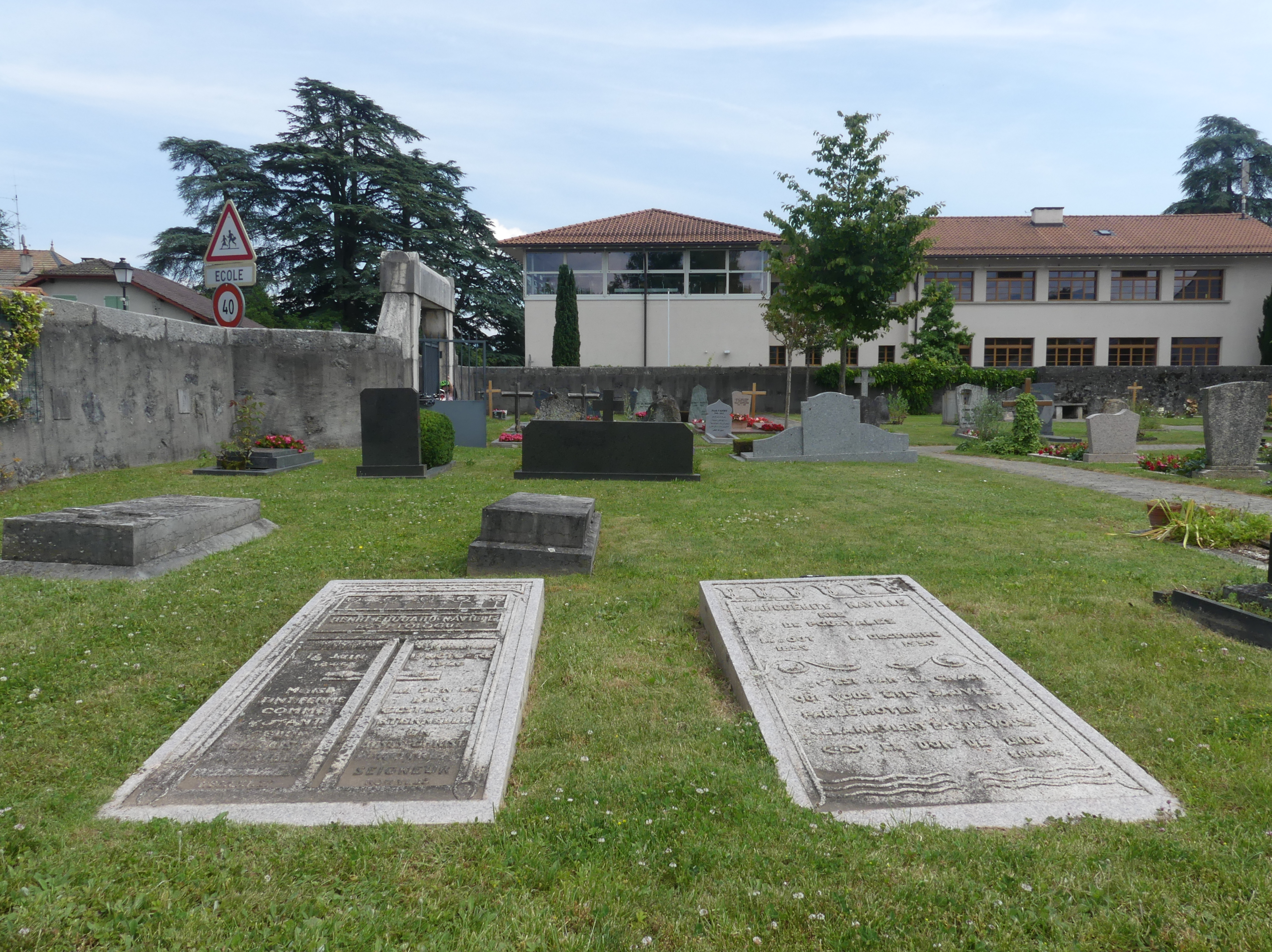
Naville's grave (right) in 2021.

Together with the Egyptologist Édouard Naville (1844-1926), whom she married in 1873, she had five children. She accompanied him on 14 trips to Egypt from 1884 to 1914. While in Egypt, it was she who managed the excavation sites, caring for the workers and carefully following the progress made. In addition to the photographs she took, she depicted the finds in the many detailed drawings which her husband used to illustrate his published works. In her many diaries, in addition to descriptions of progress on the excavations, she provided accounts of other Egyptologists, including Howard Carter. Her writings also attest to her strong Protestant beliefs, reflecting her support for the evangelical revival movement.

Marguerite Naville died in Malagny near Geneva on 14 December 1930 aged 78 years. She found her final resting place at the cemetery of Genthod in a grave next to the one of her husband.
