= Shur (Bible) =

Location in the Hebrew Bible

Shur or Sur (Hebrew: שור, romanized: Šūr), (Note: Sometimes rendered in translations as "Sur", cf. Σούρ in the Septuagint, Sur in the Vulgate.) is a location mentioned several times in the Hebrew Bible.

James K. Hoffmeier believes that the "way of Shur" was located along the Wadi Tumilat — an arable strip of land to the east of the Nile Delta, serving as the ancient transit route between Ancient Egypt and Canaan across the Sinai Peninsula.

== Biblical narrative ==
=== Genesis ===
When the servant Hagar ran away from her owner Sarah (Abram's wife),

"the Angel of the Lord found her ... by the well in the way to Shur" (Book of Genesis, Genesis 16:7, KJV).

Later, in Genesis 20, "Abraham journeyed toward the territory of the Negeb and lived between Kadesh and Shur; and he sojourned in Gerar".

According to Genesis 25:18, the borders of the Ishmaelite tribes extended "from Havilah to Shur".

=== Exodus ===
According to the Book of Exodus, Marah is located in the "wilderness of Shur":

"Then Moses led Israel from the Red Sea and they went into the Desert of Shur. For three days they traveled in the desert without finding water."

=== Samuel ===
Shur is also mentioned in 1 Samuel 15:7:

"Then Saul slaughtered the Amalekites from Havilah all the way to Shur, east of Egypt."

== Interpretation ==
Easton's Bible Dictionary (1893) says that Shur is "a part, probably, of the Arabian desert, on the north-eastern border of Egypt, giving its name to a wilderness extending from Egypt toward Philistia (Gen. 16:7; 20:1; 25:18; Ex. 15:22). The name was probably given to it from the wall which the Egyptians built to defend their frontier on the north-east from the desert tribes. This wall or line of fortifications extended from Pelusium to Heliopolis."

On the Genesis account, H. E. Ryle observes that Hagar, being Sarai's Egyptian maidservant, would "probably [follow] the main trade route leading to her own country".
