= Pithom =

Ancient human settlement

Coordinates: 30°33′7″N 32°5′55″E

Location of Pithom (as Tell El Maskhuta) in Ismailia Governorate, Egypt

pr Z1 i t tm im t niwt
pr-jtm
in hieroglyphs

Pithom (Ancient Egyptian: pr-jtm; Biblical Hebrew: פִּתֹם, romanized: Pīṯōm; Koine Greek: Ἡρώπόλις, romanized: Hērṓpólis or Ἡρώωνπόλις Hērṓōnpólis, and Πατούμος Patoúmos) was an ancient city of Egypt. References in the Hebrew Bible and ancient Greek and Roman sources exist for this city, but its exact location remains somewhat uncertain. Some scholars identified it as the later archaeological site of Tell el-Maskhuta (Arabic: تل المسخوطة, romanized: Tall al-Masḫuṭa). Others identified it as the earlier archaeological site of Tell el-Retabeh (Arabic: تل الرتابة, romanized: Tall al-Ratāba).

== Etymology ==
The English name comes from Hebrew פיתום Pithom which was taken from the Egyptian toponym pr-(j)tm, "House of Atum". Atum's cult center was in Heliopolis.

== Biblical Pithom ==
Pithom is one of the cities which, according to the Book of Exodus 1:11, was built for the biblical Pharaoh of the oppression by the forced labour of the Israelites. The other city was Pi-Ramesses. The Septuagint adds a third, "On, which is Heliopolis." This full phrase is, in the Septuagint, "τήν τε Πειθὼμ καὶ Ραμεσσῆ καὶ ῎Ων, ἥ ἐστιν ῾Ηλιούπολις." These cities are called by a term rendered in the Authorized Version "treasure cities" and in the Revised Version "store cities" (Hebrew: מסכְּנוֹת֙, romanized: miskǝnoṯ). The Septuagint renders it πόλεις ὀχυραί "strong [or "fortified"] cities." The same term is used for certain cities of King Solomon in I Kings 9:19 (comp. also II Chronicles 16:4).

== Graeco-Roman Heroöpolis ==
Approximate location of Canal of the Pharaohs

Heroöpolis was a large city east of the Nile Delta, situated near the mouth of the Royal Canal which connected the Nile with the Red Sea. Although not immediately upon the coast, but nearly due north of the Bitter Lakes, Heroöpolis was of sufficient importance, as a trading station, to confer its name upon the arm of the Red Sea which runs up the Egyptian mainland as far as Arsinoë (near modern Suez)—the modern Gulf of Suez. It was the capital of the 8th nome of Lower Egypt.

== Location ==
Early on, the location of Pithom—just like the locations of other similar sites, such as Tanis—had been the subject of much conjecture and debate.

The 10th-century Jewish scholar Saadia Gaon identified Pithom's location in his Judeo-Arabic translation of the Hebrew Bible as the Faiyum, 100 kilometres (62 miles) southwest of Cairo.

Édouard Naville and Flinders Petrie were looking for Pithom along the Wadi Tumilat, an arable strip of land serving as the ancient transit route between Egypt and Canaan across the Sinai—the biblical 'Way of Shur'.

=== Tell El Retaba ===
Eight miles west of Tell El Maskhuta is the site of Tell El Retabeh. This is approximately the midpoint of Wadi Tumilat. The earliest find known from the site is the jasper weight of king Nebkaure Khety (First Intermediate Period of Egypt), but such an object might have been brought from elsewhere. Naville identified all these locations as being in the region of Tjeku (Sukkot), the 8th Lower Egypt nome.

Excavations at the Tell El Retabeh have shown that the site was first settled during the Second Intermediate Period of Egypt. Following the expulsion of the Hyksos during the reign of Ahmose I, a short-lived Egyptian settlement followed but ended in the middle of the 18th Dynasty. At the beginning of the 19th Dynasty of Egypt, a newer settlement was established, and Ramesses II built new fortifications, a Temple of Atum and many other structures. The site was inhabited also under the 20th Dynasty, the Third Intermediate Period (11th–7th century BC) and the Late Period (7th–4th century BC).

Some scholars, such as Manfred Bietak and Kenneth Kitchen, have argued that this was the ancient Pithom. This opinion goes back to the 19th century, when Alan Gardiner first identified Pithom with the site of Tell El Retaba, and this was later accepted by William F. Albright, and Kenneth Kitchen. Although John van Seters and Neil Asher Silberman argue that Tell El Retaba was unoccupied during the period when we find monuments relating to a town called Pithom, this claim has been disputed by James K. Hoffmeier and Gary Rendsburg based on recent findings at the site.

The joint Polish-Slovak expedition has carried out a systematic research at Tell El Retaba since 2007. It is conducted with the cooperation of several institutions: Institute of Archaeology University of Warsaw, the Polish Centre of Mediterranean Archaeology University of Warsaw, the Slovak Academy of Sciences and the Aigyptos Foundation.

More recent analyses have demonstrated that the designation for the temple of Atum, pr-itm, can be found in inscriptions at both sites—both at Tell El Retaba and at Tell El Maskhuta. This seems to demonstrate that the name 'Pithom' was used originally for the earlier site, Tell El Retaba, before it was abandoned. When the newer city of Tel El Maskhuta was built, the same name was applied to it as well, as the temple of Atum was moved to El Maskhuta. Thus, in effect, 'Pithom' was moved to a new location, a phenomenon that is attested for some other cities as well, such as Migdol.

=== Wadi Tumilat Project – Tell El Maskhuta ===
In the spring of 1883, Naville believed he had identified Pithom as the archaeological site Tell El Maskhuta. The site of Pithom, as identified by Naville, is at the eastern edge of Wadi Tumilat, southwest of Ismailia. Petrie agreed with this identification. John S. Holladay Jr., a more recent investigator of the site, also supports this opinion. Alternatively, the recent Italian excavators have suggested identifying the site as the ancient city of Tjeku (Biblical Sukkot).

Here was found a group of granite statues representing Ramesses II, two inscriptions naming Pr-Itm (Temple of Atum), storehouses and bricks made without straw. Recent excavations have also uncovered a significant New Kingdom tomb at the site. The excavations carried on by Naville for the Egypt Exploration Fund uncovered a city wall, a ruined temple, and the remains of a series of brick buildings with very thick walls and consisting of rectangular chambers of various sizes, opening only at the top and without any entrances to one another.

Modern excavations at Tel El Maskhuta were carried out by the University of Toronto 'Wadi Tumilat Project' under the direction of John S. Holladay Jr. They worked over five seasons between 1978 and 1985. These excavations have shown that the history of Tel El Maskhuta is quite complex. There was a Middle Bronze IIB settlement there (18th–17th centuries BC), associated with the Hyksos, followed by a long break until the late 7th century BC, when there was rebuilding.

This construction at the end of the 7th century may have been carried out by Pharaoh Necho II, possibly as part of his uncompleted canal building project from the Nile to the Gulf of Suez.

== See also ==
- List of ancient Egyptian towns and cities
- List of ancient Egyptian sites, including sites of temples
