= Egypt Exploration Society =

British non-profit archeological organization

The Egypt Exploration Society
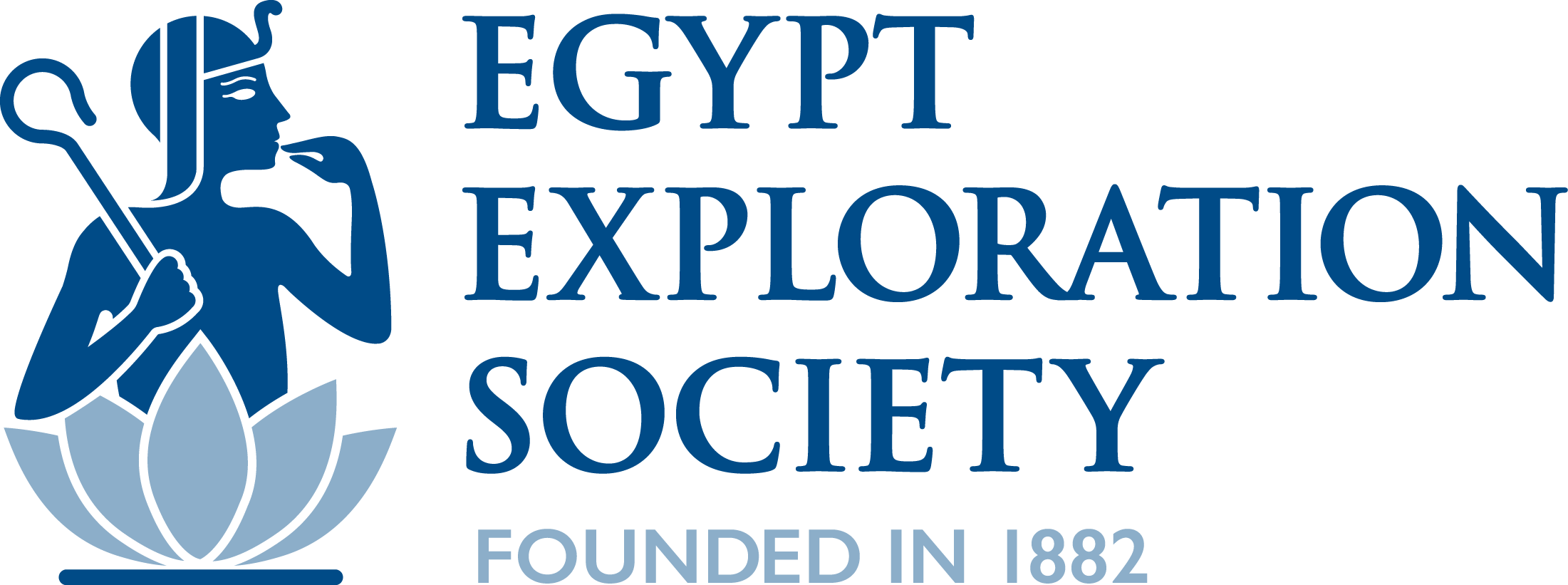
- The logo of the Egypt Exploration Society
- Abbreviation: EES
- Established: 1882; 144 years ago
- Founders: Amelia Edwards and Reginald Stuart Poole
- Type: Nonprofit
- Legal status: Charity
- Purpose: To support and promote Egyptian cultural heritage
- Headquarters: Doughty Mews
- President: Prof Doris Behrens Abouseif
- Chair: Dr Leire Olabarria
- Director: Dr Carl Graves
- Staff: 6
- Website: ees.ac.uk
- Formerly called: The Egypt Exploration Fund (1882–1919)

The Egypt Exploration Society (EES) is a British non-profit organisation founded in 1882 for the purpose of supporting and promoting Egyptian cultural heritage. It was founded by novelist and travel writer Amelia Edwards with support from Curator of Coins and Medal, Reginald Stuart Poole. It has offices in London and Cairo, and is a registered charity.

The Society has worked at many archaeological sites across the northern Nile valley and delta including Deir el-Bahri, Tanis, Abydos, and Amarna. The results of its work have been shared in more than 350 scientific publications and artefacts from their excavations can be seen in museums around the world.

== History ==
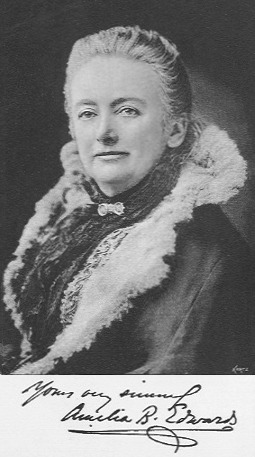
Amelia Edwards in America, 1890

In 1873, the English writer Amelia Edwards ventured to Egypt to escape Britain's cold, rainy climate and sight-see. She and several friends traveled up the Nile River, from Cairo to Abu Simbel. On her return in 1876, Edwards published her account of the trip as A Thousand Miles Up the Nile. The book became renowned for its description of 19th-century Egypt and the largely un-excavated antiques she encountered. Appealing to both popular and scholarly audiences, Edwards' book became a best seller. The attention and praise her work received prompted Edwards to continue her studies of ancient Egypt.

In 1882, Edwards collaborated with Reginald Stuart Poole, an employee from the Department of Coins and Medals at the British Museum. The two created the Egypt Exploration Fund as a way to raise funds for more excavations in the Nile Delta, which had been noted as being rarely visited by European archeologists. Edwards announced the creation of the Fund in The Times, garnering support from wealthy individuals such as the Archbishop of Canterbury, poet Robert Browning, and Sir Erasmus Wilson. After meeting with Edwards personally, Wilson was first to pledge, gifting the organization £500 in starter funds.

=== First excavation ===
The first excavator of the Egypt Exploration Fund was Édouard Naville, a Swiss Egyptologist and Biblical scholar. Naville was granted permission to survey Tell el-Maskhuta for signs of the Biblical Exodus, to drum up publicity and appeal for the Fund. In January 1883, Naville set out for Tell el-Maskhuta. Naville's expedition was a massive success, attracting the attention of the British public and potential donors. The first general meeting of the Fund was held on July 3, 1883. With the recent influx of funds and subscribers, it was decided that Naville's findings would be published and distributed to the Fund's subscriber base. The society was allowed to keep only two Artifacts from the Naville expedition; a naophorous statue of the official, Ankhkherednefer, and a falcon sculpture, both of which were donated to the British Museum where they are still on display today.

=== Second excavation ===
During the second excavation, the Fund sent Flinders Petrie, an English Egyptologist and 'father of Egyptology', to Tanis, a site linked to the Biblical city of Zoan. Petrie focused much of his work on the ordinary dwellings of the site, presenting a new array of discoveries for the society. Petrie was among the first to look for more than just artefacts he found aesthetically pleasing, viewing every discovery as significant for increasing understanding of ancient Egyptian society. He developed new Archaeological techniques for cataloging everything found at a site in a scientific manner. At the end of his excavation, Petrie was able to bring back many valuable findings and items that he donated to the British Museum. In October 1883, the society became one of the first to provide scientifically excavated objects from Petrie's expedition around Britain and overseas, sending artefacts to museums in Boston, Geneva, Edinburgh, York and Sheffield.

=== Third excavation ===
By the time of the third excavation in 1886, the society was able to send Edouard Naville, Flinders Petrie, and self-taught Egyptologist Francis Llewellyn Griffith to Egypt. The trio spent the next seasons excavating previously uncovered sites and surveying the Delta and Upper Egypt for potential ruins. While conducting a survey of standing monuments in Upper Egypt, Griffith was struck by the amount that could be learned from the preservation and study of such structures, many of which were threatened by looters and erosion. By 1889 Griffith had proposed the addition of an epigraphic branch of the fund to record and catalog all standing monuments in Egypt. Griffith's suggestion was well received, and in 1890 the first expedition of the Archeological Survey of Egypt was created for surveying standing monuments and tombs in Middle Egypt.

=== Faiyum excavations ===
In 1895, Oxford classicist Bernard Grenfell petitioned for the creation of a branch of the Fund dedicated to the preservation and study of Papyri. With the Fund's backing, Grenfell and archeologist David George Hogarth excavated sites at Bacchias, Karanis, and Oxyrhynchus, in the Faiyum region of middle Egypt. The operation uncovered hundreds of boxes worth of papyri dating from the 3rd century BCE to the 7th century CE, including a Logia Iesu, a previously unknown fragment of the gospel of Saint Thomas. 150 intact papyri were left with authorities in Egypt, while 280 boxes of papyrus fragments were sent back to London. The Society claims to have over 500,000 individual papyrus roll fragments still in their possession.

=== Name change ===
In 1919, the Egypt Exploration Fund changed its name to the Egypt Exploration Society to reflect the more active role the organization was taking in organizing and publishing findings from their excavations.

== Repatriation effort ==
From its founding up to the 1980s, local archaeologists working with the Society had a limited say in what was taken to England and what would stay in Egypt. This caused a large amount of Egyptian artifacts deemed 'culturally insignificant' by Egyptian authorities at the time to be displaced from their home country. Since ending the practice, the Society has dedicated significant amounts of resources to finding and repatriating displaced artifacts to Egypt.

In 2024, The Society launched a Walking trail at the Egyptian Museum in Cairo where guests can observe 12 artifacts from the Society's excavations. According to the Society, all new artifacts uncovered will remain in Egypt.

== Publishing works and base ==
Today, the EES continues to publish its annual journal, the Journal of Egyptian Archaeology, which details the Society's findings, for all of its members to read. They also publish a newsletter bi-annually called Egyptian Archaeology magazine. The Egypt Exploration Society has been based in Doughty Mews, London since 1969.

== 2019 theft case ==
In October 2019, officials from the Egypt Exploration Society alleged that Oxford professor, Dirk Obbink, engaged in the theft and sale of "at least 11 ancient Bible fragments to the Green family, the Hobby Lobby owners who operate a Bible museum and charitable organization in Washington." The Museum of the Bible said it would return the fragments to the Egypt Exploration Society and Oxford University.

== Notable members ==
- Dorothy Charlesworth; field director of excavations at Buto (Tell el-Farâ'în) in 1969
- Mary Chubb; the first professional excavation administrator
- H. W. Fairman; Egyptologist and director of field operations.
- Al Richardson; Trotskyist historian and Egyptologist.
- Veronica Seton-Williams; field director of excavations at Buto (Tell el-Farâ'în) 1964–1968
- Harry Smith; director of Egyptian Nubian Survey

== See also ==
- Barbara Mertz
- Palestine Exploration Fund
