= Wadi Tumilat =

Archaeological site in Egypt

Coordinates: 30.5494°N 31.9636°E

Canal of the Pharaohs, that followed Wadi Tumilat

Wadi Tumilat (Old Egyptian Tjeku/Tscheku/Tju/Tschu) is the 50-kilometre-long (31 mi) dry river valley (wadi) to the east of the Nile Delta. In prehistory, it was a distributary of the Nile. It starts near the modern town of Zagazig and the ancient town of Bubastis and goes east to the area of modern Ismaïlia.

In ancient times, this was a major communication artery for caravan trade between Egypt and points to the east. The Canal of the Pharaohs was built there. A little water still flows along the wadi. The current Sweet Water Canal also flows along the wadi.

The Arabic name "Wadi Tumilat" is believed to reflect the existence in the area, in ancient times, of an important temple of the god Atum (Old Egyptian pr-itm, 'House of Atum', changed over time into 'Tumilat', as well as into 'Pithom').

The old name of the valley is Wadi as-Sadir (Arabic: وادي السدير), which is also "Land of Goshen" in the Arabic translation of the Pentateuch.

== Archaeology ==
T k w T14 xAst
Wadi Tumilat
in hieroglyphs

T w T14 xAst
Wadi Tumilat
in hieroglyphs

T k w T14 xAst
Wadi Tumilat
in hieroglyphs

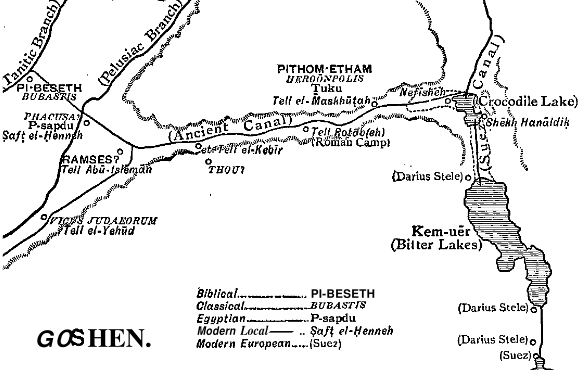
1903 map

Wadi Tumilat has the ruins of several ancient settlements. The earliest site excavated is that of Kafr Hassan Dawood, which dates from the Predynastic period to the Early Dynastic Period. Several sites, including Tell el-Retaba, Tell el-Maskhuta, Tell el-Shaqafiya, Tell el-Kuʿ feature material the Second Intermediate Period, when Wadi Tumilat provided a connection with the Levant.

Late in the New Kingdom of Egypt period, the site at Tell el-Retaba was well fortified. But then, in the Saite Dynasty period, the major settlement and fort were moved east to Tell el-Maskhuta, only 12 km (7.5 mi) to the east.

Necho II (610–595 BC) initiated—but may have never completed—the ambitious project of cutting a navigable canal from the Pelusiac branch of the Nile to the Red Sea. Necho's Canal was the earliest precursor of the Suez Canal, and it went through Wadi Tumilat. It was in connection with a new activity that Necho founded a new city of Per-Temu Tjeku which translates as 'The House of Atum of Tjeku' at Tell el-Maskhuta.

Around 1820, Muhammad Ali of Egypt, the Ottoman Governor of Egypt, brought 500 Syrians to the Wadi and equipped them with animals and labor to construct 1,000 sakias for the cultivation of mulberry trees for sericulture. The irrigation system was repaired by cleaning and deepening the existing canals. Labor was provided by forcing peasants to work.

Tell Shaqafiya in the Wadi is also associated with the Canal and its operation.

The site of Tell el Gebel is mostly of the Roman period.

In 1930, a team from the German Institute in Cairo conducted a survey of Wadi Tumilat. Later on, some Hyksos tombs were also discovered in the area at Tell es-Sahaba.

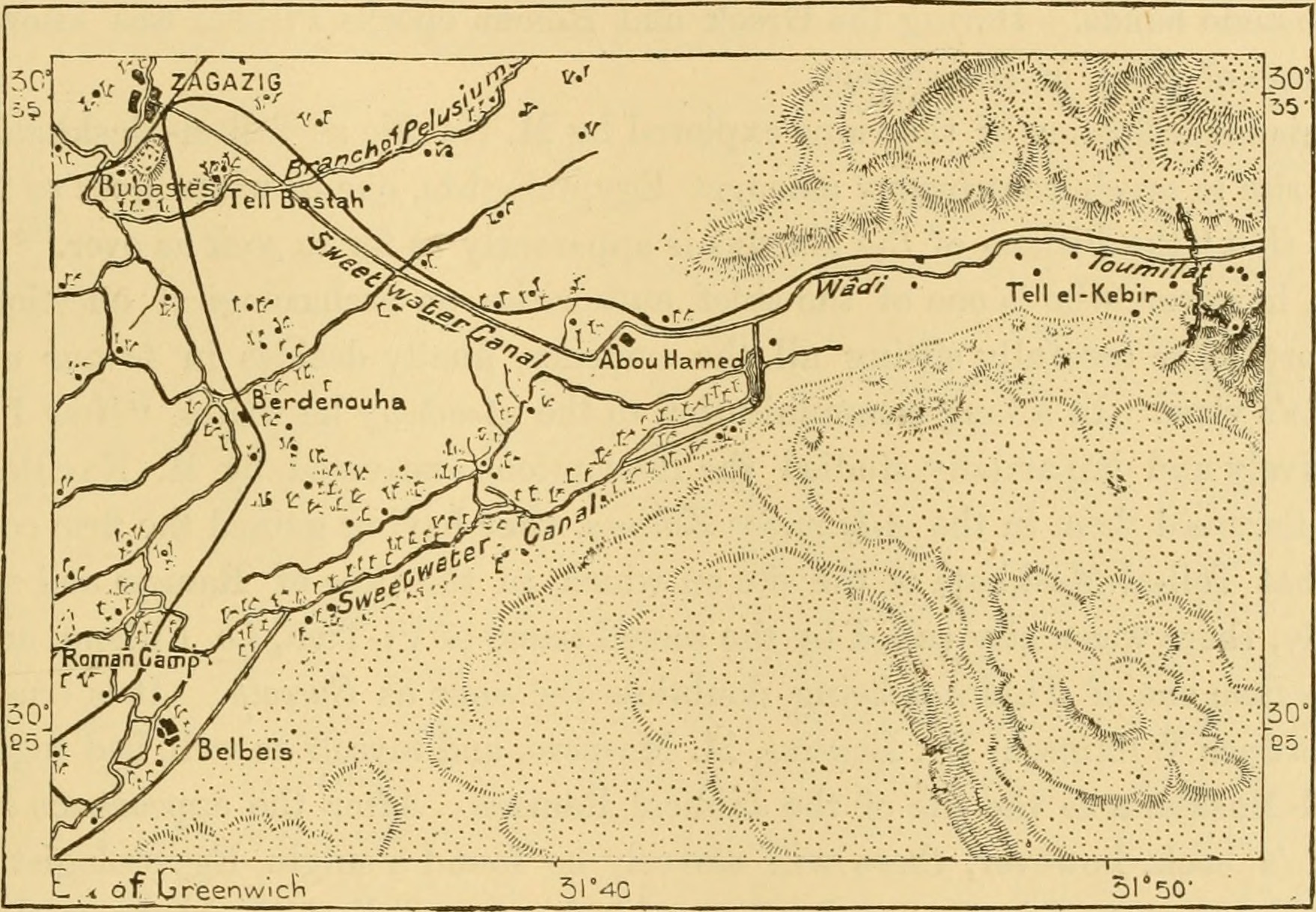
Wadi Tumilat

=== Wadi Tumilat Project ===
Modern excavations at Tell el-Maskhuta were carried out by the University of Toronto "Wadi Tumilat Project" under the direction of John S. Holladay Jr. They worked over five seasons between 1978 and 1985.

As many as 35 sites of archaeological significance have been identified in the Wadi. The three large tells in the Wadi are Tell el-Maskhuta, Tell er-Retabah, and Tell Shaqafiya.

Tell er-Retabah has been investigated by the archaeologist Hans Goedicke of Johns Hopkins University.

== Biblical references ==
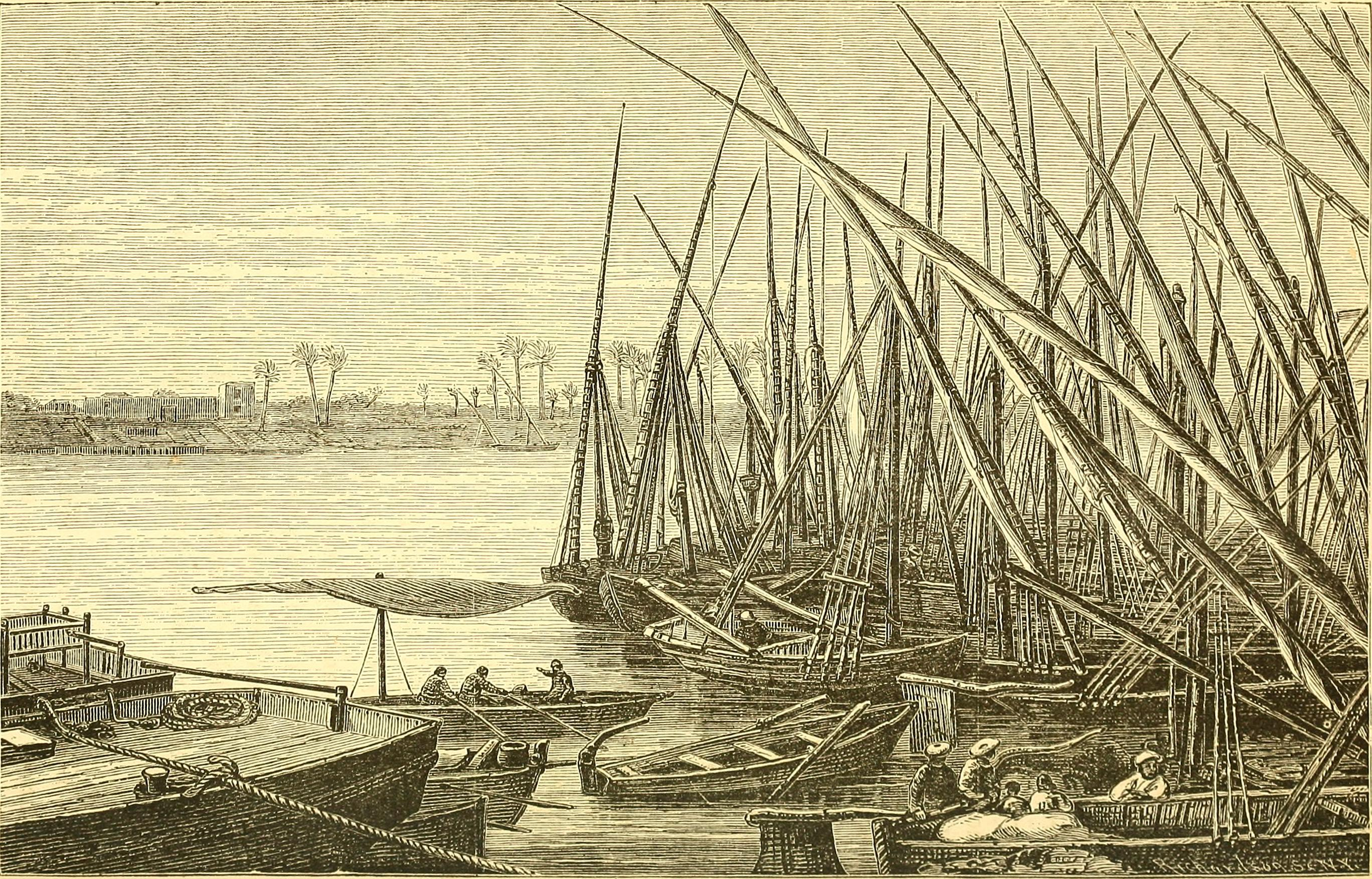
William H. Seward's travels around the world (1873) (14598126840)

There are several biblical references to the area of Wadi Tumilat. For example, the ancient Pithom is believed to be here.

The western end of the Wadi Tumilat is identified as part of the Land of Goshen.

Wadi Tumilat—an arable strip of land serving as the ancient transit route between Egypt and Canaan across the Sinai Peninsula—is also seen by scholars as the biblical "Way of Shur".

Biblical scholar Edouard Naville identified the area of Wadi Tumilat as Sukkot (Tjeku), the 8th Lower Egypt nome. This location is also mentioned in the Bible.

== See also ==
- Darius the Great's Suez Inscriptions

== Bibliography ==
- Carol A. Redmount, The Wadi Tumilat and the "Canal of the Pharaohs" Journal of Near Eastern Studies, Vol. 54, No. 2 (Apr., 1995), pp. 127–135 The University of Chicago Press
- Ellen-Fowles Morris: The architecture of imperialism - Military bases and the evolution of foreign policy in Egypt's New Kingdom. Brill, Leiden 2005, ISBN 90-04-14036-0.
- Alan Gardiner: The Delta Residence of the Ramessides, IV In: Journal of Egyptian Archaeology Nr. 5, 1918, S. 242-271.
- Edouard Naville: The store-city of Pithom and The route of the Exodus. Trübner, London 1903.
- Herbert Donner: Geschichte des Volkes Israel und seiner Nachbarn in Grundzügen - Teil 1. Vandenhoeck & Ruprecht, Göttingen 2007, ISBN 978-3-525-51679-9, S. 102-103.
- Jacques-Marie Le Père: Mémoire sur la communication de la mer des Indes à la Méditerranée par la mer Rouge et l'Isthme de Sueys. In Description de l'Égypte, État moderne I. Imprimerie Impériale, Paris 1809, S. 21 - 186, (in Volume 11, État Moderne, 2. Auflage, Digitalisat auf Google Bücher).
