= Pi-Ramesses =

Capital of the ancient Egyptian 19th dynasty

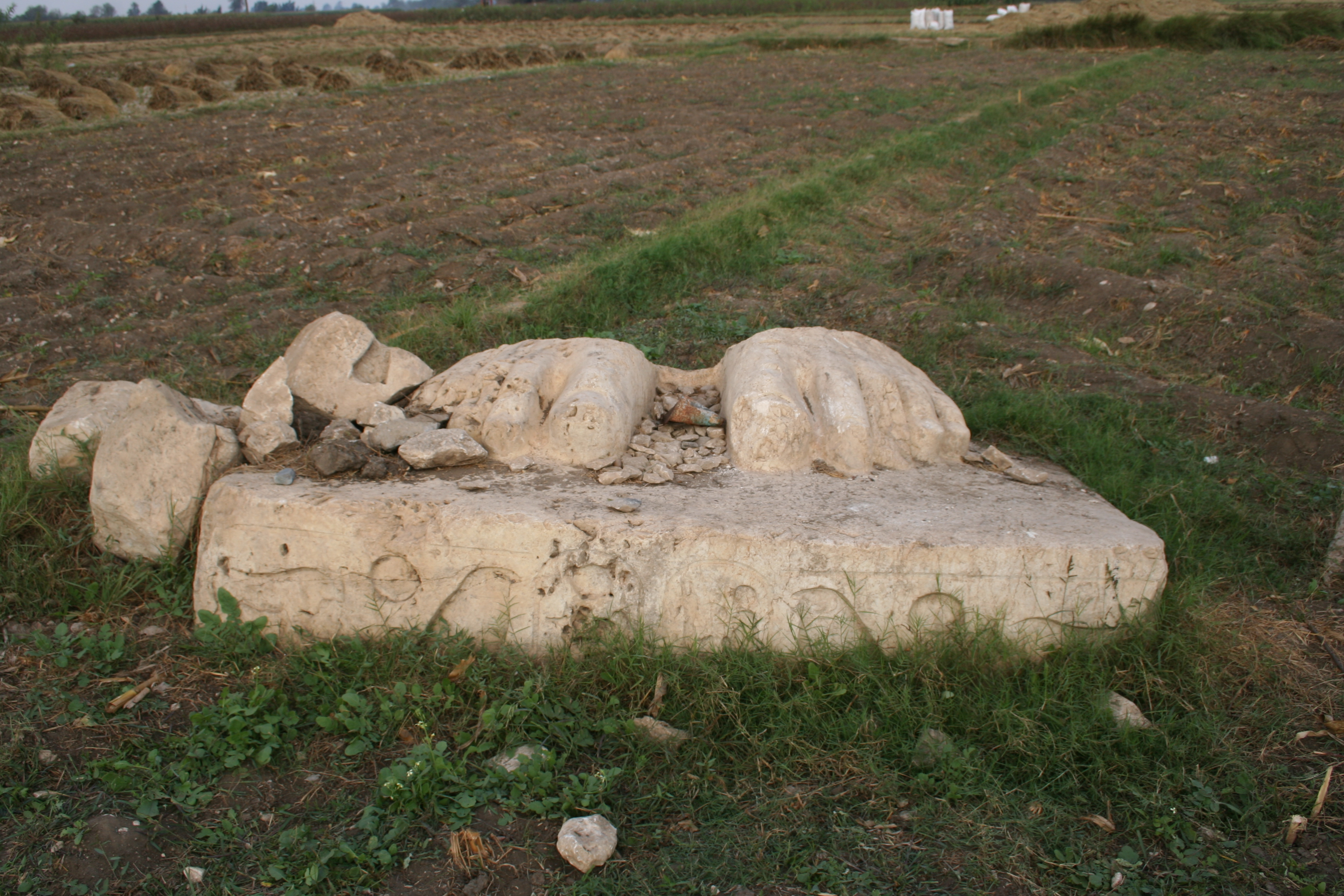
- The feet of a Ramses II statue at Pi-Ramesses

- Location within Egypt
- 30°47′56″N 31°50′9″E
- Type: Settlement
- Periods: New Kingdom to Third Intermediate Period
- Location: Qantir, Al Sharqia Governorate, Egypt
- Region: Lower Egypt

History
- Built: 13th century BC
- Built by: Ramesses II
- Abandoned: Approximately 1060 BC

Site notes
- Area: 18 km^{2} (6.9 sq mi)

Pi-Ramesses (/pɪərɑːmɛs/; Ancient Egyptian: pr-rꜥ-ms-sw, meaning "House of Ramesses") was the new capital built by the Nineteenth Dynasty Pharaoh Ramesses II (1279–1213 BC) at Qantir, near the old site of Avaris. The city had served as a summer palace under Seti I (c. 1290–1279 BC), and may have been founded by Ramesses I (c. 1292–1290 BC) while he served under Horemheb.

== Discovery ==
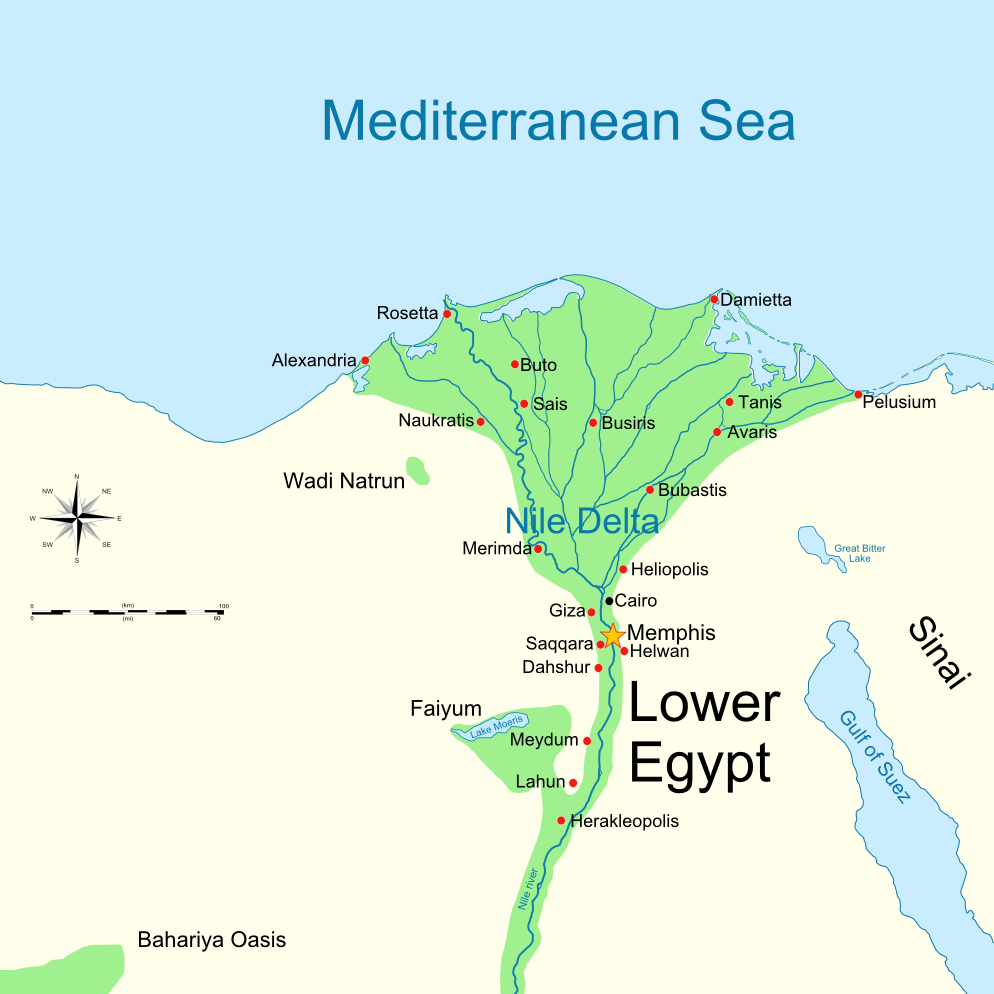
Map of Lower Egypt showing Tanis and Avaris, near Pi-Ramesses

pr Z1 ra ms s s
pr-rꜥmssw
in hieroglyphs
Era: New Kingdom
(1550–1069 BC)

In 1884, Flinders Petrie arrived in Egypt to begin his excavations there. His first dig was at Tanis, where he arrived with 170 workmen. Later in the 1930s, the ruins at Tanis were explored by Pierre Montet. The masses of broken Ramesside stonework at Tanis led archaeologists to identify it as Pi-Ramesses. Yet it eventually came to be recognised that none of these monuments and inscriptions originated at the site.

In the 1960s, Manfred Bietak recognised that Pi-Ramesses was known to have been located on the then-easternmost branch of the Nile. He painstakingly mapped all the branches of the ancient Delta and established that the Pelusiac branch was the easternmost during Ramesses' reign while the Tanitic branch (i.e. the branch on which Tanis was located) did not exist at all. Excavations were therefore begun at the site of the highest Ramesside pottery location, Tell el-Dab'a and Qantir. Although there were no traces of any previous habitation visible on the surface, discoveries soon identified Tell el-Dab'a as the Hyksos capital Avaris. Qantir was recognized as the site of the Ramesside capital Pi-Ramesses. Qantir/Pi-Ramesses lies some 30 km (19 mi) to the south of Tanis; Tell el-Dab´a, the site of Avaris, is situated about 2 km (1.2 mi) south of Qantir.

In 2017, archaeologists from the Roemer and Pelizaeus Museum unearthed footprints of children at the bottom of a mortar part, as well as pieces of painted wall, possibly fresco pending further study, believed to have served as decoration at the site of a palace or temple.

== History ==
Ramesses II was born and raised in the area, and family connections may have played a part in his decision to move his capital so far north; but geopolitical reasons may have been of greater importance, as Pi-Ramesses was much closer to the Egyptian vassal states in Asia and to the border with the hostile Hittite empire. Intelligence and diplomats would reach the pharaoh much more quickly, and the main corps of the army were also encamped in the city and could quickly be mobilised to deal with incursions of Hittites or Shasu nomads from across the Jordan.

Pi-Ramesses was built on the banks of the Pelusiac branch of the Nile. With a population of over 300,000, it was one of the largest cities of ancient Egypt. Pi-Ramesses flourished for more than a century after Ramesses' death, and poems were written about its splendour. According to the latest estimates, the city was spread over about 18 km^{2} (6.9 sq mi) or around 6 km (3.7 mi) long by 3 km (1.9 mi) wide. Its layout, as shown by ground-penetrating radar, consisted of a huge central temple, a large precinct of mansions bordering the river in the west set in a rigid grid pattern of streets, and a disorderly collection of houses and workshops in the east. The palace of Ramesses is believed to lie beneath the modern village of Qantir. An Austrian team of archaeologists headed by Manfred Bietak, who discovered the site, found evidence of many canals and lakes and have described the city as the Venice of Egypt. A surprising discovery in the excavated stables were small cisterns located adjacent to each of the estimated 460 horse tether points. Using mules, which are the same size as the horses of Ramesses' day, it was found a double tethered horse would naturally use the cistern as a toilet leaving the stable floor clean and dry.

It was originally thought the demise of Egyptian authority abroad during the Twentieth Dynasty of Egypt made the city less significant, leading to its abandonment as a royal residence. It is now known that the Pelusiac branch of the Nile began silting up c. 1060 BC, leaving the city without water when the river eventually established a new course to the west now called the Tanitic branch. The Twenty-first Dynasty of Egypt moved the city to the new branch, establishing Djanet (Tanis) on its banks, 100 km (62 mi) to the north-west of Pi-Ramesses, as the new capital of Lower Egypt. The pharaohs of the Twenty-first Dynasty transported all the old Ramesside temples, obelisks, stelae, statues and sphinxes from Pi-Ramesses to the new site. The obelisks and statues, the largest weighing over 200 tons, were transported in one piece while major buildings were dismantled into sections and reassembled at Tanis. Stone from the less important buildings was reused and recycled for the creation of new temples and buildings.

== Biblical Raamses ==
Chapter 47 of the Book of Genesis states that the Hebrews were given the Land of Goshen to reside in, but also that Joseph settled his father and brothers in the best part of the land, in the land of Rameses. The Book of Exodus mentions "Raamses" or "Rames[s]es" (both spellings appear in the Masoretic Text; Hebrew: רעמסס, romanized: Ra‘m[ə]sês) as one of the two cities (Pithom and Raamses) on whose construction the Israelites were forced to labour (Exodus 1:11), and from where they departed on their Exodus journey (Exodus 12:37 and Numbers 33:3). Understandably, this Ramesses has been identified by modern biblical archaeologists with the Pi-Ramesses of Ramesses II: the Pi- prefix ("House of") is omitted from the second city's name, but it does appear in the first one's name, Pithom (פִּתֹם), which means "House of Atum". Still earlier, the 10th-century Bible exegete Rabbi Saadia Gaon believed that the biblical site of Ramesses had to be identified with Ain Shams.

When the 21st Dynasty moved the capital to Tanis, Pi-Ramesses was largely abandoned and the old capital became a quarry for ready-made monuments, but it was not forgotten. Its name appears in a list of 21st Dynasty cities, and it had a revival under Shishaq, usually identified with the historical pharaoh Shoshenq I of the 22nd Dynasty (10th century BC), who tried to emulate the achievements of Ramesses. The existence of the city as Egypt's capital as late as the 10th century BC makes problematic the claim that the reference to Ramesses in the Exodus story is a memory of the era of Ramesses II; in fact, it has been claimed that the shortened form "Ramesses", in place of the original Pi-Ramesses, is first found in 1st millennium BC texts, although it also appears in texts from the 2nd millennium BC. These toponyms are viewed by some as being authentic cultural memories from the 19th to 20th Dynasty (or shortly after). However, they have also been considered to be editorial choices and anachronisms from the 7th century BC, reflecting the time of composition under Egyptian domination.

Ramesses II moved the capital of Egypt from Thebes to Pi-Ramesses because of its military potential, thus he built storehouses, docks and military facilities in the city, which could explain why Exodus 1:11 calls the site a "treasure city".

== See also ==
- List of ancient Egyptian towns and cities
- List of historical capitals of Egypt

== Notes ==
Preceded by Thebes	Capital of Egypt; 1279 BC – 1078 BC	Succeeded by Tanis
