= Sukkot (place) =

Location mentioned in the Hebrew Bible

The name Sukkot (Succoth) appears in a number of places in the Hebrew Bible as a location.

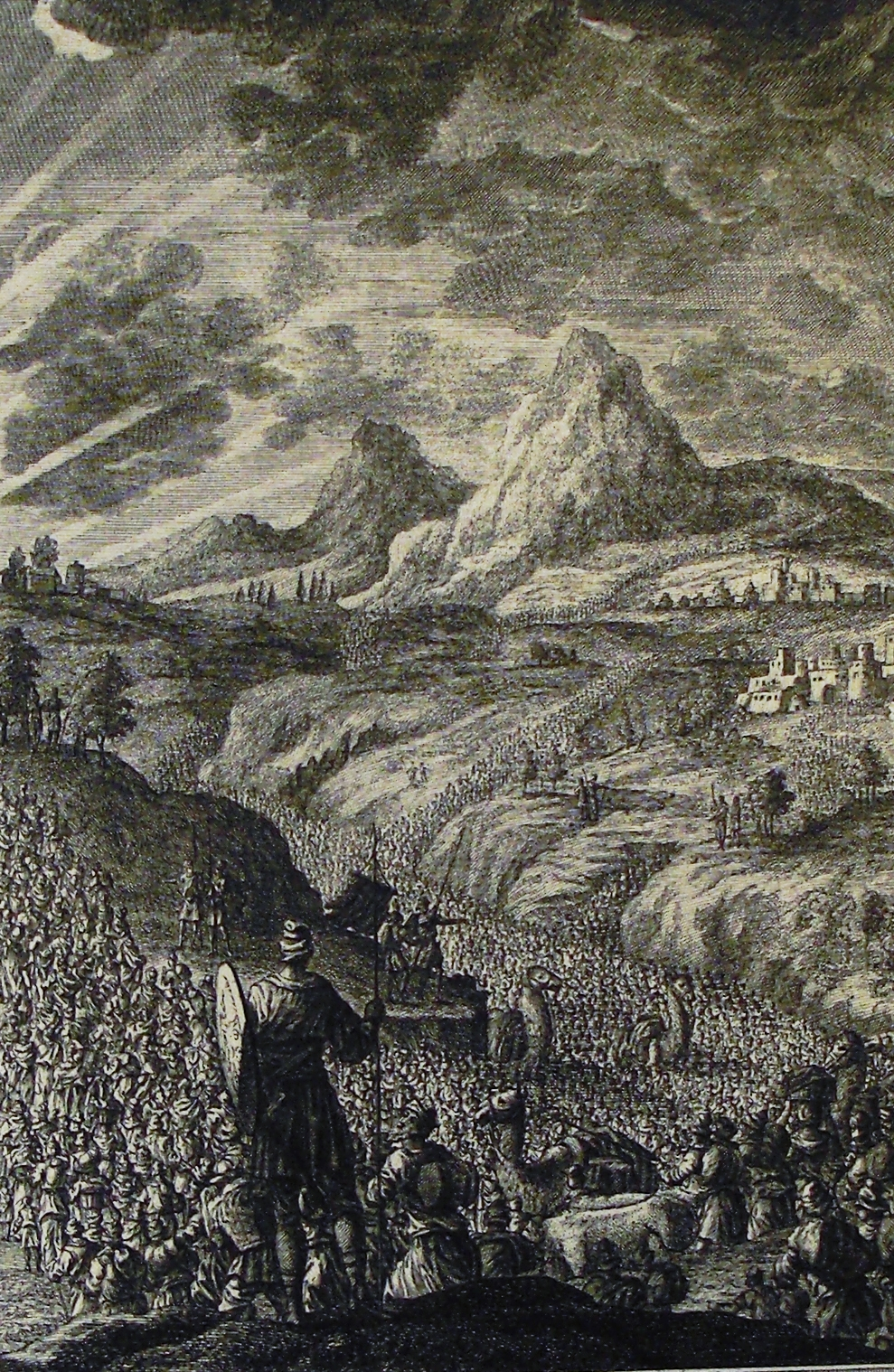
Depiction of the Hebrews camping in Succoth

== Egypt ==
An Egyptian Sukkot is the second of the stations of the Exodus. According to the Hebrew bible, God had sent Moses to rescue the Israelites from captivity by an unnamed Pharaoh - who later allowed the Israelites to leave Egypt, and they journeyed from their starting point at Rameses to Succoth (Exodus 12:37). This Sukkot is believed by many scholars to be an adaptation of the Egyptian toponym Tjeku, which is located in the eastern Delta.

== Transjordan ==
Another Sukkot is a city east of the Jordan River, identified as tell Deir Alla, a high debris mound in the plain north of the Zarqa River and about one mile from it (Joshua 13:27). The identification is based on a passage in the Jerusalem Talmud, which was compiled in the 4th century, in which the biblical Sukkot was identified with a settlement called Dar'ellah.

This is where Jacob, after returning from Paddan Aram and meeting with his brother Esau, built a house for himself and made sukkot (temporary huts, or "booths") for his cattle in Genesis 33:17. The account in Genesis has Jacob tell Esau that he would follow him to Mount Seir, although as recorded in the narrative, "he [had] no intention of settling there", and he goes to Sukkot instead.

In the Book of Judges, the princes of Sukkot refused to provide help to Gideon and his men when they followed one of the bands of the fugitive Midianites after the great victory at Mount Gilboa. After routing this band, Gideon, upon his return, visited the rulers of the city with severe punishment according to Judges 8:16: "And he took the elders of the city and, [bringing] desert thorns and briers, he punished the people of Succoth with them."

The foundries for casting the metalwork for the temple were erected here according to 1 Kings 7:46.

== See also ==
- Deir Alla Inscription
