= Manfred Bietak =

Austrian archaeologist

- Born: Manfred Bietak; 6 October 1940 (age 85); Vienna, Austria
- Education: University of Vienna
- Occupation: Archaeologist

Manfred Bietak (born in Vienna, 6 October 1940) is an Austrian archaeologist. He is professor emeritus of Egyptology at the University of Vienna, working as the principal investigator for an ERC Advanced Grant Project "The Hyksos Enigma" and the founder and editor-in-chief of the 1990 journal Ägypten und Levante (Egypt and the Levant) and of four series of the Austrian Academy of Sciences, Institute of Oriental and European Archaeology (2016–2020).

== Specialty ==
Bietak is best known as the director of the Austrian excavations at two sites in the Nile Delta: Tell El-Dab'a, which was identified as the location of Avaris, the capital of the Hyksos period; and Piramesse, which was the capital of the Nineteenth Dynasty of Egypt. The site was also most probably the naval base Peru-nefer of Thutmosis III and Amenhotep II. A palace precinct of those kings, furnished with Minoan frescoes was one of the most important discoveries. Bietak has also conducted excavations in western Thebes (Luqsor), where he discovered the huge tomb of Ankh-Hor, Chief steward of the Divine Wife of Amun Nitokris (26th Dynasty). Since 2013 he conducts excavations at the Middle Kingdom Palace at Bubastis.

== Career ==
Bietak studied archeology at University of Vienna, obtaining his Dr. phil. in 1964 and an honorary PhD. in 2009. In 1961–1964, he took part in the archaeological rescue expedition of UNESCO at Sayala in Nubia, and he also supervised excavations there; in 1965 he was the director of the expedition. During 1966–1972, he was the scientific secretary and later the scientific counsellor at the Austrian Embassy in Cairo. In 1973, he founded the Austrian Archaeological Institute in Cairo; he has been the director of the institute until 2009.

Bietak is the founder and director of the Austrian Archaeological Institute in Cairo 1973–2009. He was chairman of the Institute of Egyptology (1984–2009) and of the Vienna Institute of Archaeological Science (2004–2011) at the University of Vienna and chairman of the Commission for Egypt and the Levant at the Austrian Academy of Sciences. From 1999 to 2011, he was also founder and first speaker of the Special Research Programme (SFB) "Synchronisation of Civilisations in the Eastern Mediterranean in the Second Millennium BC – SCIEM 2000" at the Austrian Academy of Sciences. In 1997 and 2006, he was visiting professor at the Collège de France; in 2004, he was Martha Whitcomb visiting professor at Harvard; between 2016 and 2017 he was guest scholar at the Getty Research Institute at Malibu, California. He is professor emeritus of Egyptology at the University of Vienna.

== Affiliations ==
Bietak has been elected to several scholarly institutions: Foreign Honorary Member of the Archaeological Institute of America; Full Member of the Austrian Academy of Sciences; Corresponding Fellow of the British Academy; Full Member of German Archaeological Institute; Membre titulaire de l'Institut d'Égypte; Foreign Fellow of the Royal Swedish Academy of Letters; Membre associé de l'Institut de France : Académie des Inscriptions et Belles-Lettres; Fellow of the Society of Antiquaries; Foreign Member of the Royal Society of Arts and Sciences in Gothenburg; Foreign Fellow of the Polish Academy of Sciences and Foreign Fellow of the Accademia Nazionale dei Lincei in Rome and an honorary member of the American Academy of Arts and Sciences at Cambridge, Ma. He is also a member of the following: Council of the International Union of Egyptologists (1976–2013); Scientific Committee of the International Congress on the Archaeology of the Ancient Near East; Visiting Committee of the Egyptian Department of the Metropolitan Museum of New York.

Additionally, he has supervised or reviewed at least 40 PhD dissertations and at least 18 Masters theses, at the universities of Amsterdam, Berlin, Cambridge, Copenhagen, Göttingen, Hamburg, Helwan, London, Vienna.

In 2006, there was a three-volume Festschrift published in his honour. The Festschrift includes a list of works that Bietak authored or co-authored up to 2006: 21 monographs, 164 research articles, and 17 review articles. Bietak has also edited or co-edited 8 periodicals, including the Egyptological journal Egypt and the Levant.

In 2015, Bietak won from the European Research Council an ERC Advanced Grant "The Hyksos Enigma" and is principal investigator and head of this project which is accommodated at the Austrian Academy of Sciences and at the Bournemouth University, UK. This project explores the origins of western Asiatic populations in the Nile Delta during the Middle Kingdom (c. 2000–1800 BC) and the Second Intermediate Period (c. 1800–1530 BC) and how the Hyksos seized power in Lower Egypt. Research also is focused on the reasons for the decline and failure of the Hyksos 15th Dynasty and its lasting impact on the Egyptian culture of the New Kingdom.

== Bibliography ==
This partial list is taken from Manfred Bietak bibliography page

- M. Bietak, “Minoan Wall-paintings Unearthed at Ancient Avaris,” Egyptian Archaeology: Bulletin of the Egyptian Exploration Society 2(1992) 26–28.
- M. Bietak, “Connections between Egypt and the Minoan World: New Results from Tell el-Dab’a/Avaris,” in W. V. Davies and L. Schofield (eds.), Egypt, the Aegean and the Levant (London 1995) 19–28.
- M. Bietak, "Avaris: The capitol of the Hyksos, Recent Excavations at Tell el-Dabca, Published by the British Museum Press, (1996)
- M. Bietak, “‘Rich beyond the Dreams of Avaris: Tell el-Dab’a and the Aegean World – A Guide for the Perplexed’. A Response to Eric H. Cline,” Annual of the BSA 95(2000) 185–205.
- M. Bietak, “Minoan Presence in the Pharaonic Naval Base of Peru-nefer,” in O. Krzsyzkowska (ed.), Cretan Offerings: Studies in Honour of Peter Warren [BSA Studies 18] (London 2010) 11–24.
- M. Bietak, J. Dorner, I. Hein, and P. Janosi, “Neue Grabungsergebnisse aus Tell el-Dab’a und ‘Ezbet Helmi im östlichen Nildelta 1989–1991,” Ägypten und Levante 4(1994) 9–80.
- M. Bietak and N. Marinatos, “The Minoan Wall Paintings from Avaris,” Ägypten und Levante 5(1995) 49–62.
- M. Bietak and N. Marinatos, “Avaris (Tell el-Dab’a) and the Minoan World,” in A. Karetsou (ed.), Krete-Aigyptos: Politismikoi desmoi trion chilietion (Athens 2000) 40–44.
- M. Bietak, N. Marinatos, and C. Palyvou, “The Maze Tableau from Tell el-Dab’a,” in S. Sherratt (ed.), Proceedings of the First International Symposium “The Wall Paintings of Thera” I (Athens 2000) 77–88.
- M. Bietak, N. Marinatos, and C. Palyvou, Taureador Scenes in Tell el-Dab’a (Avaris) and Knossos (Vienna 2007).
- M. Bietak, “Bronze Age Paintings in the Levant: Chronological and Cultural Considerations,” in: M. Bietak, & E. Czerny (ed.), The Synchronisation of Civilisations in the Eastern Mediterranean in the Second Millennium BC (vol. III), Proceedings of the SCIEM 2000-Euro Conference, Vienna, 2–7 May 2003, in: Contributions to the Chronology of the Eastern Mediterranean, ed. by M. Bietak & H. Hunger, vol. VII, Vienna 2007, 269–300.
- M. Bietak, “From where came the Hyksos and where did they go”, in: M. Marée (ed.), The Second Intermediate Period (Thirteenth – Seventeenth Dynasties): Current Research, Future Prospects, OLA 192, (Leuven 2010) 139–181.
- M. Bietak, „Houses, Palaces and Development of Social Structure in Avaris,” in: M. Bietak, E. Czerny & I. Forstner-Müller, Cities and Urbanism, International Workshop in November 2006 at the Austrian Academy of Sciences Vienna, UZK XXXV, Denkschriften der Gesamtakademie LX (Vienna 2010), 11–68.
- M. Bietak, “A Palace of the Hyksos Khayan at Avaris,“ in: P. Matthiae, F. Pinnock, L. Nigro, and N. Marchetti (eds.), Proceedings of the 6th International Congress on the Archaeology of the Ancient Near East (5 May – 10 May 2008 »Sapienza«, Università di Roma), vol. II (Wiesbaden 2010), Harrassowitz, 99–109.
- M. Bietak, “Le Hyksos Khayan, son palais et une lettre en cuneiforme,” CRAIBL 2010, 973–990.
- M. Bietak, “Minoan Presence in the Pharaonic Naval Base of Peru-nefer,” in: O. Krzyszkowska (ed.), Cretan Offerings: Studies in Honour of Peter Warren, BSA Studies 18 (London 2010 11–24.
- M. Bietak, “La Belle Fête de la Vallée : l’Asasif revisité”, in: Chr. Zivie-Coche et Ivan Guermeur (eds.), "Parcourir l'éternité", Hommages à Jean Yoyotte, Bibliothèque de l'École des Hautes Études, Section des Sciences religieuses (Paris 2012) 135–163.
- M. Bietak, “On the Historicity of the Exodus: What Egyptology Today Can Contribute to Assessing the Sojourn in Egypt,” in T. E. Levy, T. Schneider and W.H.C. Propp (eds.), Israel's Exodus in Transdisciplinary Perspective: Text, Archaeology, Culture, and Geoscience (Heidelberg-New York-Dordrecht-London 2015) 17–36.
- M. Bietak, “Harbours and Coastal Military Bases in Egypt in the 2nd Millennium BC: Avaris – Peru-nefer – Piramesse,” in: H. Willems & J.-M. Dahms (Hrsg.), The Nile: Natural and Cultural Landscape in Egypt. Proceedings of the International Symposium held at the Johannes Gutenberg-Universität Mainz, 22 & 23 February 2013, (Bielefeld 2016) 53–70.
- M. Bietak, "The Timespan of Hyksos Rule (15th Dynasty)," in: J. Driessen & T. Fantuzzi, Chronos, Stratigraphic Analysis, Pottery Seriation and Radiocarbon Dating in Mediterranean Chronology, Aegis 26, 57-81. 2024
- M. Bietak, "The Unexpected Origin of the People Behind Hyksos Rule in Egypt" in GRAFIK: DOMINIK FILL (2024)
