= Édouard Naville =

Swiss archaeologist, Egyptologist and Biblical scholar (1844–1926)

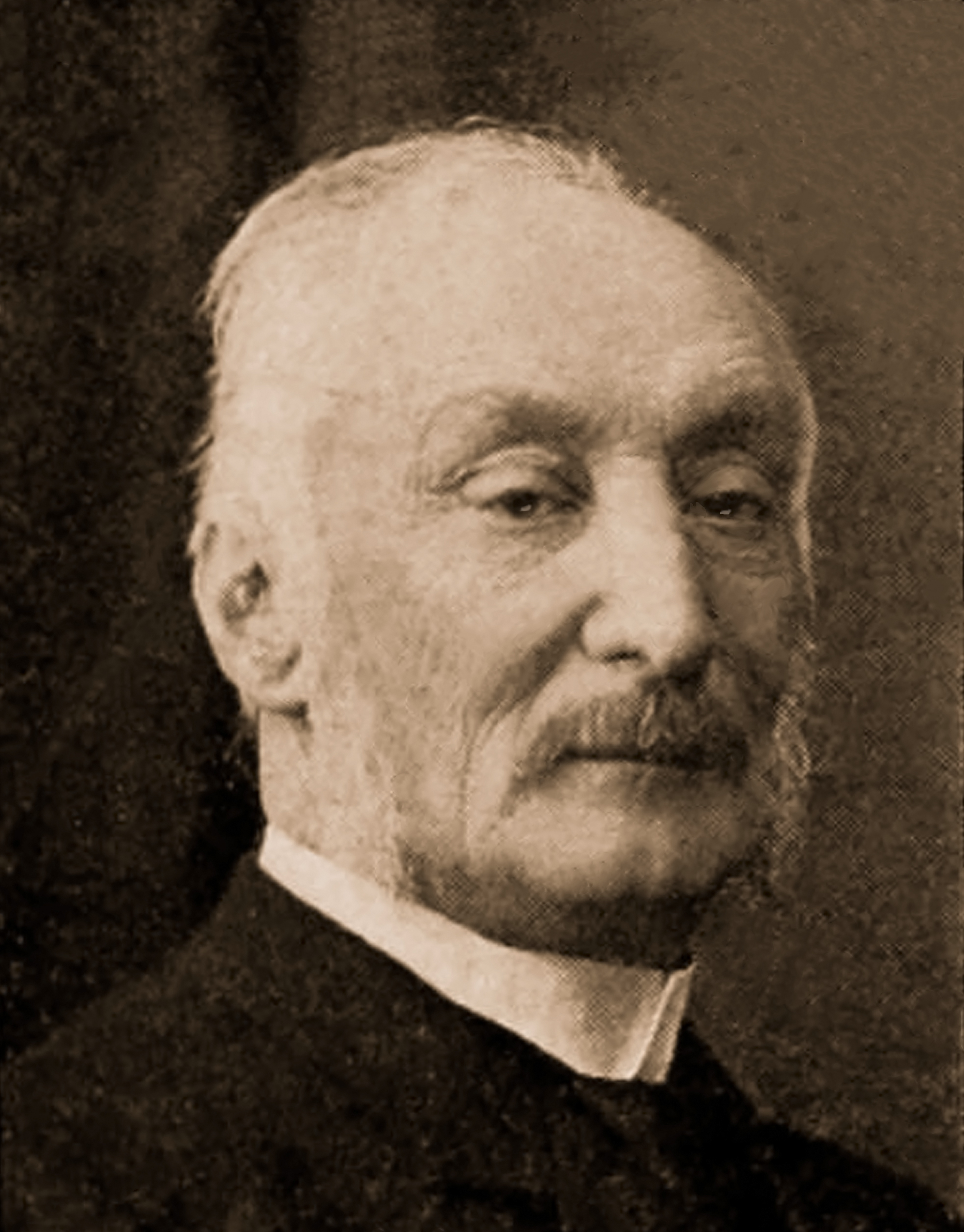
- c. 1917
- Born: Henri Édouard Naville; 14 June 1844; Geneva, Switzerland
- Died: 17 October 1926 (aged 82); Malagny, Genthod, Switzerland
- Occupations: Egyptologist, biblical scholar

Henri Édouard Naville (14 June 1844 – 17 October 1926) was a Swiss archaeologist, Egyptologist and Biblical scholar.

Born in Geneva, he studied at the University of Geneva, King's College, London, and the Universities of Bonn, Paris, and Berlin. He was a student of Karl Richard Lepsius and later his literary executor.

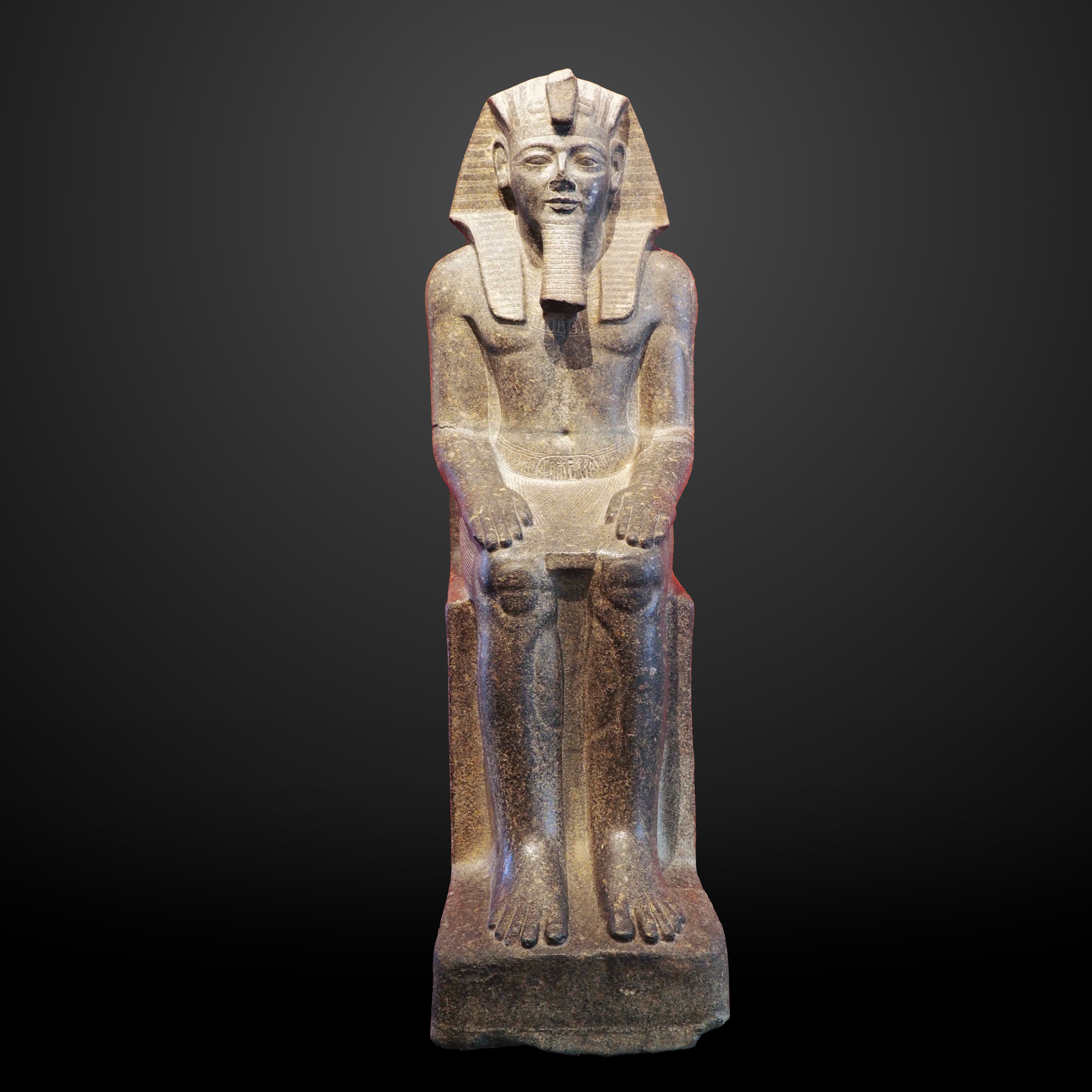
Statue of Ramesses II found by Naville at Bubastis, on display at Musée d'Art et d'Histoire in Geneva

He first visited Egypt in 1865, where he copied the Horus texts in the temple at Edfu. During the Franco-Prussian War he served as a captain in the Swiss army. His early work concerned the solar texts and the Book of the Dead. In 1882 he was invited to work for the newly founded Egypt Exploration Fund. He excavated a number of sites in the Nile Delta including Tell el-Maskhuta (1882), the Wadi Tumilat (1885–86), Bubastis (1886–89), Tell el-Yahudiyeh (1887), Saft el-Hinna (1887), Ahnas (1890–91), Mendes and Tell el-Muqdam (1892). Many of the objects he found in his Delta excavations are preserved in the Cairo Museum, British Museum, and the Museum of Fine Arts, Boston.

In the 1890s he excavated at the Mortuary Temple of Hatshepsut at Deir el-Bahri where he was assisted by David George Hogarth, Somers Clarke and Howard Carter. In 1903-06 he returned to Deir el-Bahri to excavate the Mortuary Temple of Mentuhotep II, assisted by Henry Hall. In 1910 he worked in the royal necropolis at Abydos and his last excavation work was in the Osireion at Abydos which was left incomplete at the start of World War I.

In 1873, he married Marguerite de Pourtalès who accompanied him on his 14 archaeological trips to Egypt, meticulously recording his finds in photographs and drawings and including detailed accounts of the expeditions in her diaries.

Naville was the recipient of numerous international awards and honors and was the author of innumerable publications, both on his excavations and his textual studies. He died at Malagny (near Geneva) in 1926.

Naville was an archaeologist of the old fashioned school that concerned itself with large scale clearance of sites and little regard for the detailed evidence possibly to be found in the course of excavation. In his lifetime he was criticized by W. M. Flinders Petrie for his archaeological methods and D. G. Hogarth was sent by the Egypt Excavation Fund to observe and report on the nature of his work at Deir el-Bahri. His published reports are evidence of the lack of detail, but this is also typical of much of the archaeological practice of the time.

He received an honorary doctorate (LL.D) from the University of Glasgow in June 1901.

== Publications ==
- The Law of Moses
- The Store-city of Pithom and the Route of the Exodus
- The Higher Criticism in Relation to the Pentateuch
- The Text of the Old Testament
- Archaeology of the Old Testament: Was the Old Testament Written in Hebrew?
- The Transvaal Question: From a Swiss Point of View (1900)
- The Egyptian Book of the Dead (1904)
