= Baal-zephon =

Epithet of the storm god Ba'al

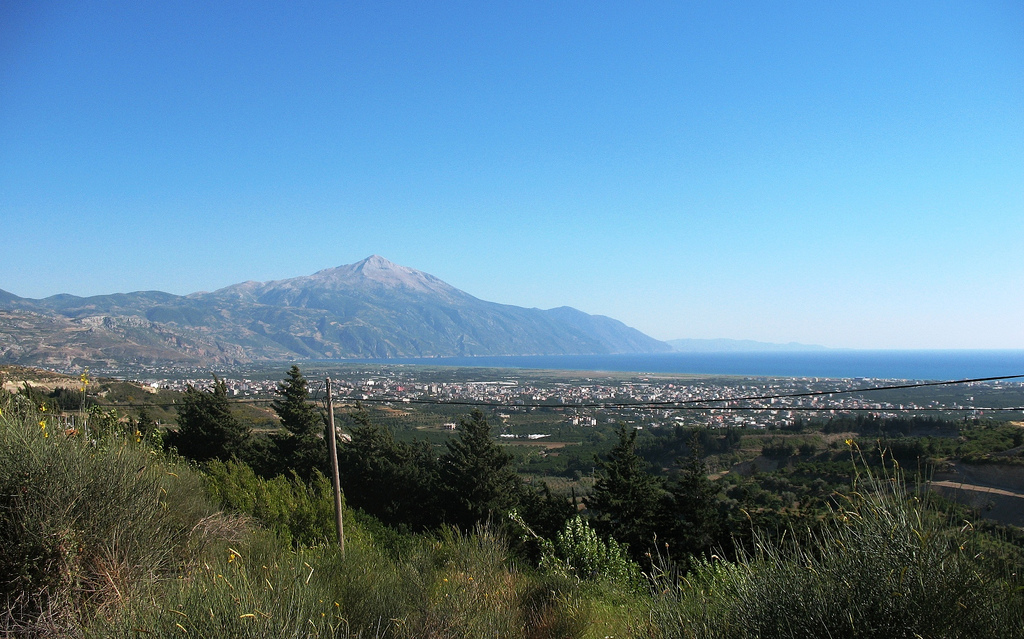
Mount Ṣapōn

Baʽal Zephon (Hebrew: בעל צפון, romanized: Baʿal Ṣəp̄on, lit. 'Lord of Ṣafon'; Akkadian: Bēl Ḫazi (^{d}IM ḪUR.SAG); Ugaritic: 𐎁𐎓𐎍 𐎕𐎔𐎐, romanized: Baʿlu Ṣapuni; Hurrian: Tešub Ḫalbağe; Ancient Egyptian: 𓃁𓏮𓐰𓂋𓏤𓃫𓍑𓄿𓊪𓐱𓏲𓐰𓈖𓄿𓐱𓌙𓐰𓈉, romanized: bꜥr ḏꜣpwnꜣ), also transliterated as Baal-zephon, was an epithet of the Canaanite storm god Baʿal (lit. "Lord") in his role as lord of Jebel Aqra, called "Mount Zaphon" in antiquity. (Note: This location is usually associated with the modern Jebel Aqra on the Syrio-Turkish border, but that identification has been challenged by Mario Liverani based on William F. Albright's claim that the Amarna letters' Ṣapuna does not refer to the mountain near Ugarit but to a city named Ṣapuma or Ṣabuma at the mouth of the Jabbok. In 1967, Ross placed it in "the Shephelah region, not far from the kingdom of Gezer. Juan-Pablo Vita rejected the identification of Ṣabuma with the Biblical Zaphon, proposing it instead referred to Zebʿoim.) He is identified in Ugaritic texts as Hadad.

Because of the mountain's importance in the Biblical narrative and location, Zephon (Hebrew: צפון, romanized: ṣap̄on) came to metonymously signify "north" in Hebrew. The name is, therefore, sometimes given in translation as Lord of the North. (Note: As, for example, by the International Standard Bible Encyclopedia.)

Baʿal Zephon was equated with the Greek god Zeus Kasios and later with the Roman Jupiter Casius.

Because Baʿal Zephon was considered a protector of maritime trade, sanctuaries were constructed in his honor around the Mediterranean Sea by his Canaanite and Phoenician devotees. "Baal-zephon" thereby became a placename—most notably mentioned in the Book of Exodus as the location where the miraculous Passage of the Red Sea happened during the Exodus.

== God ==
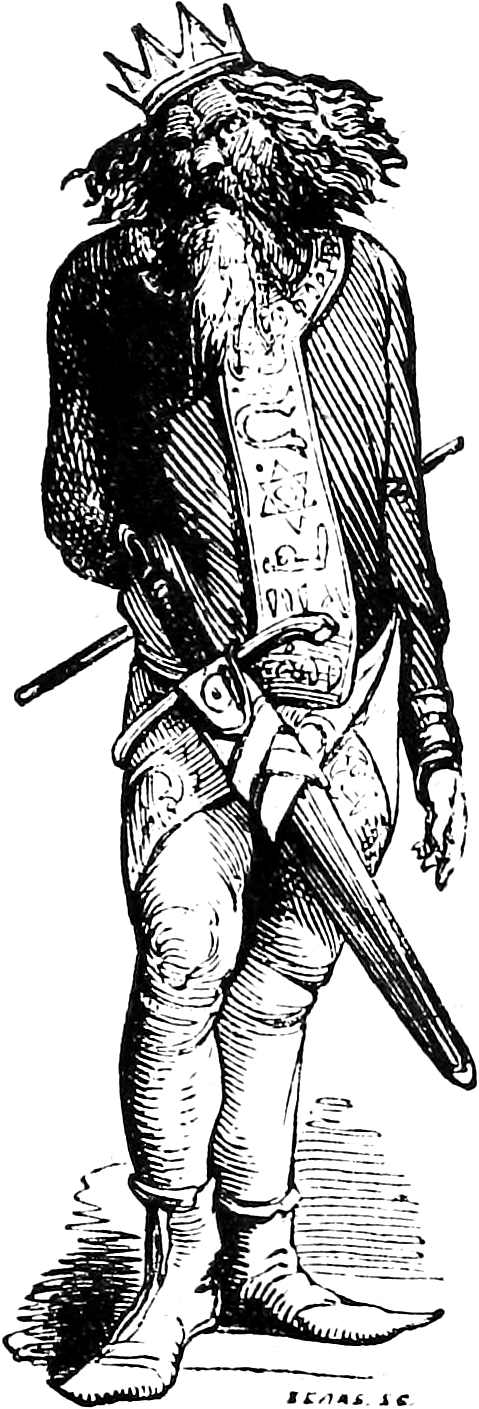
An illustration of Baalzephon in the Infernal Dictionary by Collin de Plancy

The name Baʿal Zaphon never appears in the mythological texts discovered at Ugarit. Instead, it occurs in guides to ritual and in letters, where it is used to differentiate this form of Baʿal from others such as Baʿal Ugarit. The iconography of a storm god standing on two mountains is associated with him. The earliest discovered depiction of the god – where he stands astride two mountains in a smiting posture (a posture associated with Baal in general) – dates to the 18th century BC. Other depictions show him crowned and bearing a scepter. As a protector of maritime trade, his temples also received votive stone anchors. The treaty between Asarhaddon and King Baʿal of Tyre ranks Baʿal Zaphon third behind Baʿal Shamem and Baʿal Malage. In addition to his temple at Jebel Aqra and Ugarit, Baʿal Zaphon is known to have been worshipped at Tyre and Carthage and served as the chief god of the colony at Tahpanes.

A 14th-century letter from the king of Ugarit to the Egyptian pharaoh (KTU2 2.23) places Baʿal Zaphon as equivalent to Amun. Temples to Zeus Kasios are attested in Egypt, Athens, Epidauros, Delos, Corfu, Sicily, and Spain, with the last mention occurring on Rome's German border in the 3rd century.

== Location ==
1st-millennium BC Assyrian texts mention Baʿal Zaphon as the name of the mountain itself. Locally, this mountain was worshipped in its own right.

The books of Exodus and Numbers in the Hebrew Scriptures records that the Israelites were instructed by YHWH to camp across from a place named "Baʿal Zaphon" in order to appear trapped and thereby entice the Pharaoh to pursue them: (Note: Eissfeldt argued that the Biblical mention of Baʿal Zaphon actually referred to the god having originally received credit for the salvation of the Israelites, but it is usually accepted as a placename.)

Speak unto the children of Israel, that they turn and encamp before Pihahiroth, between Migdol and the sea, over against Baalzephon: before it shall ye encamp by the sea. For Pharaoh will say of the children of Israel, They are entangled in the land, the wilderness hath shut them in. And I will harden Pharaoh's heart, that he shall follow after them; and I will be honoured upon Pharaoh, and upon all his host; that the Egyptians may know that I am the Lord. And they did so.

Gmirkin identified this as Arsinoe on the Gulf of Suez. A Ptolemaic-era geographical text at the Cairo Museum lists four border fortresses, the third being "Midgol and Baʿal Zaphon". In context, it appears to have been located on a route to the Red Sea coast, perhaps on the canal from Pithom to a location near Arsinoe. On the other hand, David A. Falk has noted that Baal-zephon is mentioned in Papyrus Sallier IV as an ancient Egyptian place, which was probably located northeast of the Wadi Tumilat.

According to Herodotus (who considered it to mark the boundary between Egypt and Syria), at Ras Kouroun, a small mountain near the marshy Lake Bardawil, the "Serbonian Bog" of Herodotus, where Zeus' ancient opponent Typhon was "said to be hidden". Here, Greeks knew, Baal Sephon was worshipped.

== Ba'al Zephon stele ==
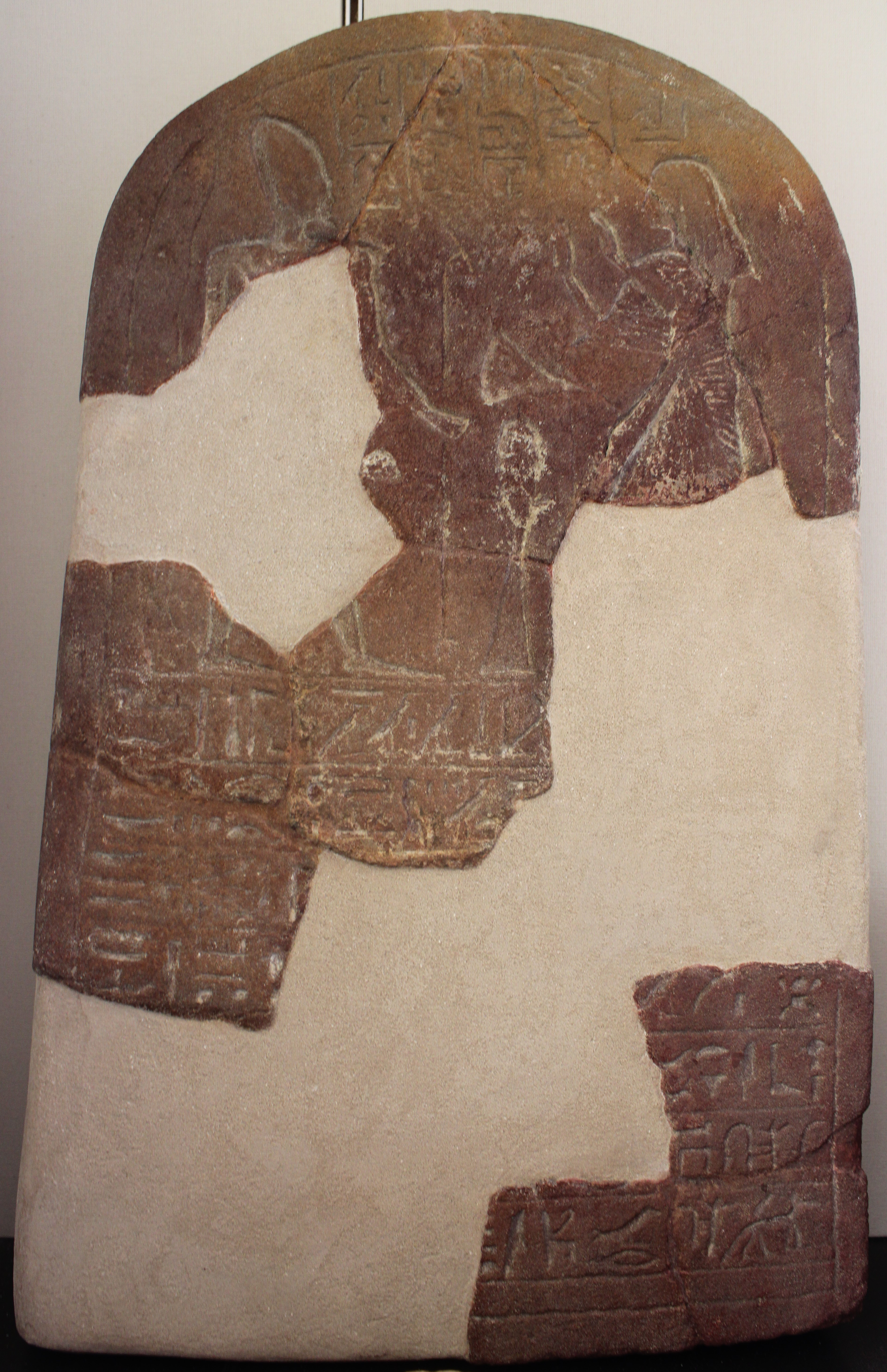
Baal Zephon stele

The only instance where the Canaanite god is depicted in both image and language is a wholly Egyptian work featuring Ba'al Zephon. Eythan Levy notes a parallel between Ba'al Zephon and the "Asiatic Seth." Seth's attributes are horns, an ankh in one hand, a was sceptre in the other, and a beard. He wears a conical hat resembling the white crown of Egypt with a long string ending in a tassel that looks like a lotus flower. Ba'al here seems to be depicted largely the same way.

== See also ==
- Baʿal
- Baʿal Hammon

== Notes and references ==
=== Bibliography ===
- "Zaphon", Dictionary of Deities and Demons in the Bible, 2nd ed., Grand Rapids: Wm. B. Eerdmans Publishing, 1999, pp. 927–928.
- Eerdmans Dictionary of the Bible, Grand Rapids: Wm B. Eerdmans Publishing, 2000, ISBN 978-0-8028-2400-4.
- Bromiley, Geoffrey W., ed. (1996), International Standard Bible Encyclopedia, Grand Rapids: Wm. B Eerdmans Publishing, ISBN 978-0-8028-3781-3.
- Albright, William F. (1943), "Two Little Understood Amarna Letters from the Middle Jordan Valley", Bulletin of the American Schools of Oriental Research, No. 89.
- Eissfeldt, O. (1932), Baal Zaphon, Zeus Kasios, und der Durchzug der Israeliten durchs Meer, Halle.
- Fox, Robin Lane (2009), Travelling Heroes in the Epic Age of Homer, New York: Knopf.
- Gmirkin, Russell E. (2006), Berossus and Genesis, Manetho and Exodus, T. & T. Clark, ISBN 978-0-567-02592-0.
- Liverani, Mario (1998), Le lettere di el-Amarna 1. Le lettere dei "Piccoli Re", Brescia. (in Italian)
- Niehr, H. (1999), "Baal-zaphon", Dictionary of Deities and Demons in the Bible, 2nd ed., Grand Rapids: Wm. B. Eerdmans Publishing, pp. 152–154.
- Vita, Juan-Pablo (2005), "Der biblische Ortsname Zaphon und die Amarnabriefe EA 273-274", Ugarit-Forschungen, No. 37, pp. 673–677. (in German)
