= Thennesus (titular see) =

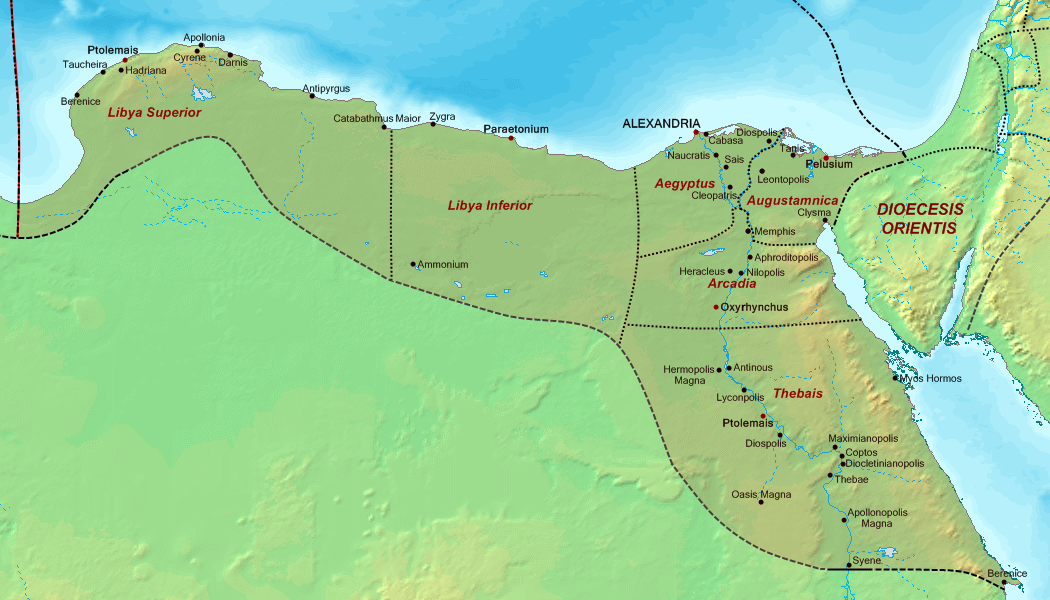
Map of the civil diocese of Egypt (5th century)

Thennesus was a town in the Roman province of Augustamnica Prima. It was on the Tanitic branch of the Nile. It is today called Tell-Tenis, Tell-Tannis or Qôm-Tannis, at the extremity of an island in Lake Menzaleh, near the Suez Canal. There are remains, ruins and tombs, of the Roman era.

Its bishopric was a suffragan see of Pelusium, the capital and metropolitan see of the province.

Cassian gives a description of the little island which included this bishopric. Its inhabitants were given solely to commerce, lacking arable land. The bishop of this locality had just died when Cassian arrived there; and they were about to name a successor. In 451 Heron, another of its bishops, was condemned by the Council of Chalcedon for not having anathematized the Patriarch Dioscorus.

During the 8th century the Patriarch of Antioch, Dionysius of Tell Mahre, landed there. About 870 the monk Bernard was well received there by the inhabitants, who were almost all Christians. Thennesus is also mentioned in a Coptic Notitia episcopatuum.

== See also ==
- Pelusium
- Lake Menzaleh
- Augustamnica
- Council of Chalcedon
- Coptic Christianity
- Notitia episcopatuum
