= Casius =

Casius can refer to:

- Casius (see), a former see of the Catholic Church
- Casius quadrangle, a map of Mars
- Mount Casius (disambiguation), several mountains

== See also ==
- Cassius (disambiguation)
