= Ostracine =

Coordinates: 31.1174°N 33.4317°E

Ostracine (Ancient Greek: Οστρακινη, Ostrakinē) was an ancient city in the Roman province of Augustamnica Prima. It also served as a Latin Catholic bishopric, a suffragan of Pelusium, the metropolitan see of the province.

== History ==
Pliny the Elder (Hist. naturalis, V, xiv) places the town sixty-five miles from Pelusium. Ptolemy (IV, v, 6) locates it in Cassiotis, between Mount Cassius and Rhinocolura. Hierocles, George of Cyprus and other geographers always mention it as in Augustamnica.

Josephus ("Bellum Jud.", IV, xi, 5) mentions that Vespasian stopped there with his army on the way from Egypt into Palestine; the city then had no ramparts. It received its water from the Delta by a canal. A Roman garrison was stationed there.

Le Quien (Oriens christianus, II, 545) speaks of three bishops, Theoctistus, Serapion and Abraham, who lived in the fourth and fifth centuries.

There is in this region, near the sea, a small town called Straki, which probably replaced Ostracine.

== Jakob Lorber ==
Jakob Lorber mentioned Ostracine in his The Youth of Jesus (Lorber Verlag - Bietigheim), giving his account of what he received from the Inner Word during the years 1843 to 1851. In this account the Holy Family went to Ostracine with the help of the Roman authorities, especially Governor of Syria Cyrenius, who resided in Tyre at that time and who brought them by his own ship to Ostracine.
