= Hephaestus, Egypt =

Ancient Roman town in present-day Egypt

Hephæstus was a town in Roman Egypt, in the province of Augustamnica Prima, the eastern part of the Nile Delta.

The name Hephæstus is known only from ecclesiastical sources; its Egyptian name and its site are unknown.

== Ecclesiastical history ==
The original diocese was in Augustamnica Prima, a suffragan of Pelusium.

It is mentioned by Hierocles and by George of Cyprus, as among the thirteen towns of Augustamnica Prima.

Le Quien mentions only two bishops: John, who took part in two Councils of Ephesus (First, 431 and Second, 449), and Peter, present at the Council of Constantinople in 459.

It remains a Roman Catholic titular see.

== Sources ==
The entry cites:

- Heinrich Gelzer, Georgii Cyprii descriptio orbis romani (Leipzig, 1890), 112;
- William Smith, Dictionary of Greek and Roman Geography, s. v.
