= Casius (see) =

Coordinates: 31°13′05″N 33°04′40″E

Casius or Casium (Ancient Greek: Κασιον, Kasion) was a residential episcopal see in the Roman province of Augustamnica Prima in Lower Egypt, and is now a titular see of the Catholic Church.

The article about it in the Catholic Encyclopedia of 1908 calls the see "Casium", but the official yearbook of the Holy See gives "Casius" as the Latin form (and "Casio" in Italian).

== Location ==
The city that gave its name to the see was not far from Pelusium and close to the sandhills known to Greek geographers as the Casium Mountain (Κασιον Ορος, Kasion Oros), today Ras Kouroun, El-Katieh, or El-Kas. Its ruins are at Mahemdiah.

A temple of Zeus Kasios, the Aramean god Qasiou, was at the city. Pompey was murdered nearby and was buried there.

== Bishops ==
The town is mentioned in Georgius Cyprius, Hierocles's Synecdemos (727, 2), and Parthey's Notitia Prima, about 840, as a bishopric depending on Pelusium.

Only one bishop is known, Lampetius, present at the Council of Ephesus in 431. Saint Cyril of Alexandria sent him, together with Hermogenes, Bishop of Rhinocorua, to Rome, where both were present at the consecration of Pope Sixtus III. Many letters of Isidore of Pelusium are addressed to him.
