= Aphnaeum =

City in Ancient Egypt

Aphnaeum (Ancient Greek: Αφναιον, Aphnaion) was an ancient city and former bishopric in Egypt. It is currently a Latin Catholic titular see. Its location is believed to be near the ruins of modern Tell-Defenneh.

== History ==
Aphnaeum was important enough in the Egyptian Roman province of Augustamnica Secunda to become a suffragan bishopric of the Metropolitan of provincial capital Pelusium, but it faded with the town.

=== Titular see ===
It was nominally restored in 1933.

It is vacant, having had only two incumbents, both of the lowest (episcopal) rank :

- Joseph Alexander Fernandes (1949.01.24 – 1951.04.12) as Auxiliary Bishop of Calcutta (India) (1949.01.24 – 1951.04.12), later Metropolitan Archbishop of Delhi and Simla (India) (1951.04.12 – 1959.06.04), restyled Metropolitan Archbishop of Delhi (1959.06.04 – 1967.09.16), also Apostolic Administrator of Simla and Chandigarh (India) (1966 – 1967.04.13)
- Gregorio Espiga e Infante, Augustinian Recollects (O.A.R.) (1955.07.03 – 1997.04.15) as Apostolic Vicar of Palawan (Philippines) (1955.07.03 – 1987.12.18)

== Source and External links ==
- GigaCatholic, with titular incumbent biography links
