= Augustamnica =

Roman province in Egypt

Provincia Augustamnica ἐπαρχία Αὐγουσταμνικῆς
- Province of the Byzantine Empire, Diocese of Egypt
- 315 AD–641 AD
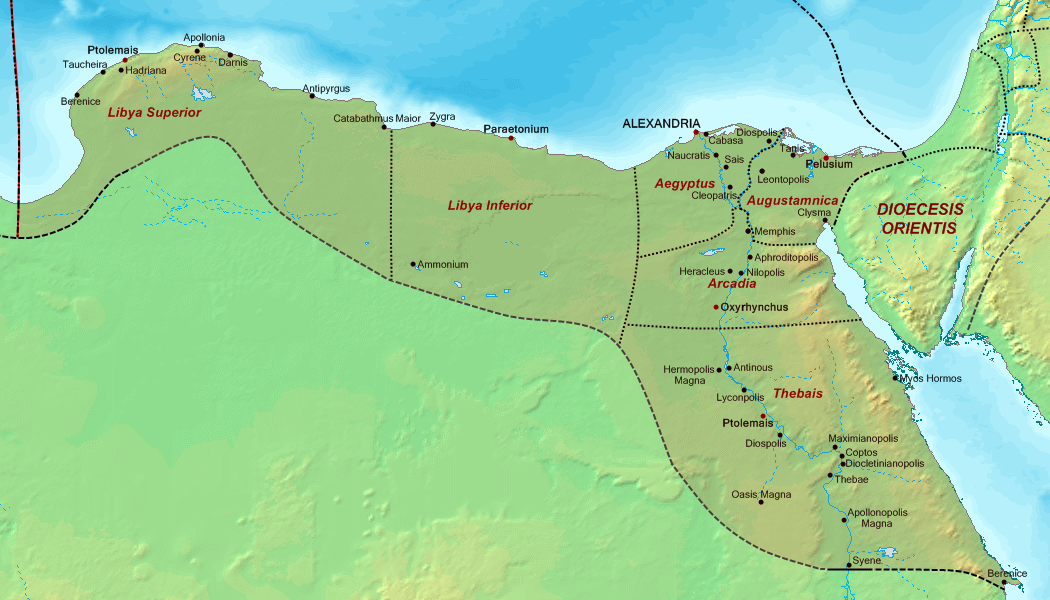
- Diocese of Egypt, c. 400 AD
- Capital: Pelusium
- Historical era: Antiquity
  - Division by emperor Diocletian: 315 AD
  - Persian occupation: 612–628 AD
  - Arab-Byzantine Wars: 641 AD
Preceded by	Succeeded by
Roman Egypt	Rashidun Caliphate
- Today part of: Egypt

Augustamnica (Latin) or Augoustamnike (Greek) was a Roman province of Egypt created during the 4th century and was part of the Diocese of Oriens first and then of the Diocese of Egypt, until the Muslim conquest of Egypt in the 640s.

Some ancient episcopal sees of the province are included in the Catholic Church's list of titular sees.

== Augustamnica ==
The province was instituted in tetrarchic times under the name of Aegyptus Herculia (for Diocletian's colleague Maximian), with ancient Memphis as capital (315-325), but later re-merged in Aegyptus. In 341 the province was reconstituted, but the name was changed into Augustamnica to remove pagan connotations. It consisted of the Eastern part of the Nile Delta and the ancient Heptanomia, and belonged to the Diocese of Oriens.

Augustamnica was the only Egyptian province under a corrector, a lower ranking governor.

Around 381 the provinces of Egypt become a diocese in their own right, and so Augustamnica became part of the Diocese of Egypt. Between 386 and the end of the 4th century the new province of Arcadia Aegypti, named after Emperor Arcadius, was created with territory from Augustamnica, the Heptanomia; Augustamnica's capital was moved to Pelusium.

From the military point of view, the province was under the Comes limitis Aegypti. According to the Notitia dignitatum, the province hosted several military units:

- Ala secunda Ulpia Afrorum at Thaubasteos
- Ala secunda Aegyptiorum at Tacasiria,
- Cohors prima sagittariorum at Naithu
- Cohors prima Augusta Pannoniorum at Tohu,
- Cohors prima Epireorum at Castra Iudaeorum
- Cohors quarta Iuthungorum at Affroditus
- Cohors secunda Ituraeorum at Aiy
- Cohors secunda Thracum at Muson
- Cohors quarta Numidarum at Narmunthi

== Augustamnica I and II ==
Before 539, Augustamnica was divided into two provinces: Augustamnica Prima (First - North) and Augustamnica Secunda (Second - South).

Augustamnica Prima had Pelusium as metropolis (administrative centre) and was under a corrector, who governed the following cities: Pelusium, Setroithes (or Sethroitis), Tanis, Thmuis, Rhinocorura, Ostracine (or Ostracina), Pentaschoinon, Casium, Aphnaion, Hephaestus, Panephysis, the Tents outside Gerra, the Tents inside Gerra, Thennesus, Panephusis.

Leontopolis was the capital of Augustamnica Secunda.

== Episcopal sees ==
Ancient episcopal sees of Augustamnica I listed in the Annuario Pontificio as titular sees:

- Aphnaeum (ruins of Tell-Defenneh?)
- Casius
- Damiata
- Gera
- Hephaestus
- Ostracine
- Panephysis (near Lake Menzaleh)
- Pelusium, the Metropolitan Archbishopric
- Phacusa
- Rhinocorura (Arish)
- Shata
- Sela (near El Qantara)
- Sethroë (between San-El-Hagar and Tell-Farama)
- Tamiathis
- Tanis
- Thennesus
- Thmuis

Ancient episcopal sees of Augustamnica II listed in the Annuario Pontificio as titular sees:

- Arabia (Uadi-Tumilat)
- Athribis
- Babylon
- Bubastis
- Clysma
- Heliopolis in Augustamnica
- Leontopolis in Augustamnica, the Metropolitan archbishopric
- Pharbaetus
- Phelbes
