= Hurbayt =

horbit هربيط DalaM
- Location in Egypt
- Coordinates: 30°44′4.79″N 31°37′14.87″E
- Country: Egypt
- Governorate: Sharqia
- Time zone: UTC+2 (EET)
  - Summer (DST): UTC+3 (EEST)

Horbit (Arabic: هربيط) is a town in Sharqia Governorate of Egypt.

It's an ancient town referred to in a stele of the 7th century BC, and described by Herodotus, Strabo, and Pliny.

It served as the capital of the nome of Pharbaethites/Lapt in Lower Egypt.

== Etymology ==
The town's Arabic name comes from Coptic Pharbait (Coptic: ⲫⲁⲣⲃⲁⲓⲧ), which in turn is derived from Ancient Egyptian: Pr-Ḥrw-mr.ty, lit. 'house of the two eyed Horus'. It was also known as Sheten (Ancient Egyptian: Štꜣn).

In Ptolemaic and Roman Egypt it was known as Pharbaithos (Ancient Greek: Φάρβαιθος) or Pharbaethus. This name is reproduced under the form Karbeuthos in George of Cyprus.

== Ecclesiastical history ==
The original diocese was a suffragan of Leontopolis, in Augustamnica Secunda, Egypt.

There is a record of Bishop Arbetion at Nicæa in 325, and Bishop Theodorus in 1086, but it is possible that the latter was bishop of another Pharbætus situated further to the west, and which according to Vansleb was equally a Coptic see. John of Nikiu relates that under the Emperor Phocas (602–10) the clerics of the province killed the Greek governor Theophilus.

It remains a Roman Catholic titular see under the name Pharbaetus.

== See also ==
- List of ancient Egyptian towns and cities

== Sources ==
- Charles, Robert H. (2007) [1916]. The Chronicle of John, Bishop of Nikiu: Translated from Zotenberg's Ethiopic Text. Merchantville, NJ: Evolution Publishing. ISBN 9781889758879.

Attribution

- The entry cites:
  - Heinrich Gelzer, Georgii Cyprii Descriptio orbis romani, 114–16;
  - ROUGÉ, Géographie ancienne de la Basse Egypte (Paris, 1891), 66–74;
  - Émile Amélineau, La Géographie de l'Egypte à l' époque copte (Paris, 1893), 330.
