= Yam Suph =

Body of water in the Book of Exodus

In the Exodus narrative, the Yam Suph (Hebrew: יַם-סוּף, romanized: Yam-Sup̄, lit. 'Reed Sea'), sometimes translated as Red Sea, is the body of water where the Crossing of the Red Sea happened in the story of the Exodus. This phrase appears in over twenty other places in the Hebrew Bible. This has traditionally been interpreted as referring to the Red Sea, following the Septuagint's rendering of the phrase. However, an appropriate translation remains a matter of dispute, as is the exact location.

Heinrich Karl Brugsch suggested that the Reed Sea is Lake Bardawil, a large lagoon on the north coast of the Sinai Peninsula. More recently, Manfred Bietak and James K. Hoffmeier have argued for an identification with the Ballah Lakes. Hoffmeier equates the Yam Suph with the Egyptian term pꜣ-ṯwfj "the papyrus marsh" from the Twentieth Dynasty of Egypt, which refers to lakes in the eastern Nile Delta. He also describes references to pꜣ-ṯwfj in the context of the Island of Amun, considered modern Tell el-Balamun. Reeds tolerant of saltwater flourish in the shallow string of lakes extending from Suez north to the Mediterranean Sea, which Kenneth Kitchen argues are acceptable locations for the Yam Suph.

== Translation and location ==
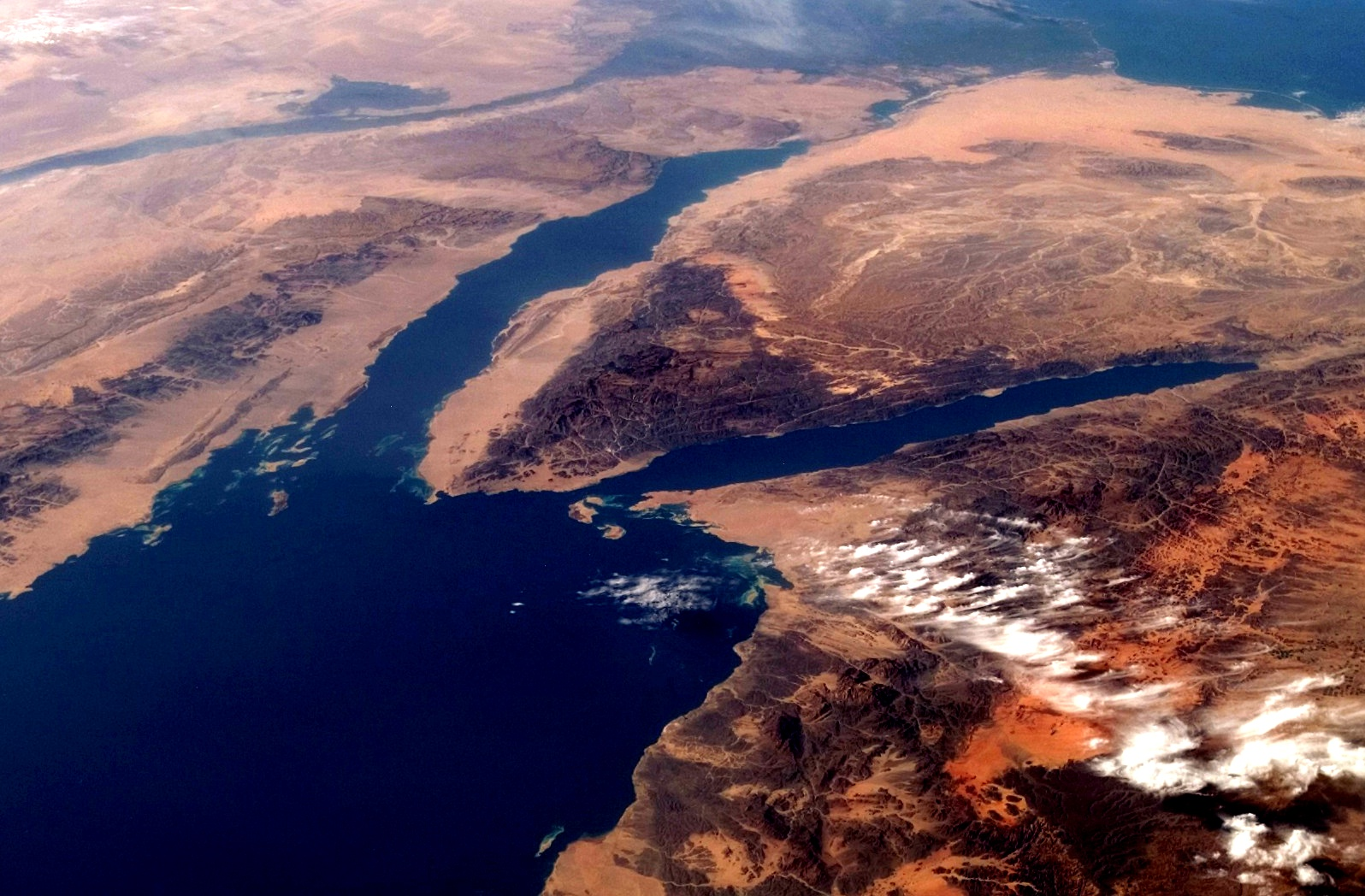
The Gulf of Aqaba, to the east/right. Also visible are the Gulf of Suez to the west/left, the Sinai Peninsula separating the two gulfs, and part of the Red Sea in the lower left corner.

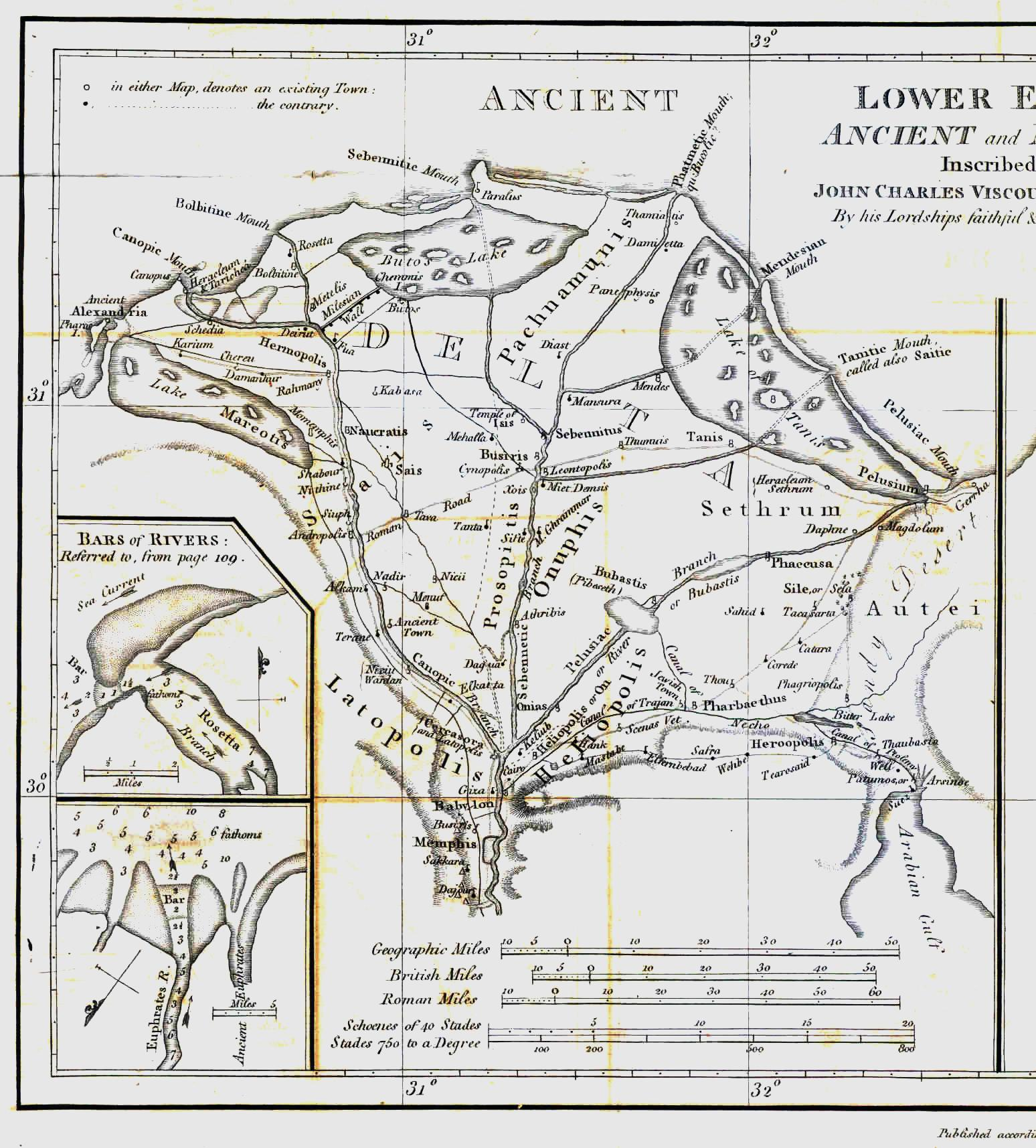
The Nile delta at the time of Herodotus, according to James Rennell (1800).

The Hebrew word yam means 'sea', and the word suph by itself means 'reed', e.g. in Exodus 2:3; hence, a literal translation of yam suph—with the two words combined in construct state—yields 'sea of reeds'. This was pointed out as early as the 11th century by Rashi, who nonetheless identified the yam suph mentioned in the locust plague as the saltwater inlet located between Africa and the Arabian Peninsula—known in English as the Red Sea. The term was rendered as 'Red Sea' in the King James Version, the most widely utilized English translation of the Bible. More recently, alternative understandings of the term have been proposed for passages in which it refers to the crossing the Red Sea as told in Exodus 13–15; as such, yam suph is sometimes rendered as 'sea of reeds' or 'sea of seaweed' in modern translations, rather than as 'Red Sea'. If the vowel is placed differently "Soph" could be translated "Sof" which means 'end' and this passage has also been translated as "Sea at the End."

There are many proposals for the location of the yam suph of Exodus. It may refer to Lake Timsah, which has since become part of the Suez Canal. Lake Timsah was in Lower Egypt, specifically in the Suez valley next to the Sinai Peninsula, and north of the Gulf of Suez. It could also be the Gulf of Aqaba, which is referred to as the yam suph in the Books of Kings (1 Kings 9:26). The Lake of Tanis, a former coastal lagoon fed by the Pelusiac branch of the Nile, has also been proposed as the place Moses parted the waters.

Heinrich Karl Brugsch suggested that the Reed Sea is Lake Bardawil, a large lagoon on the north coast of the Sinai Peninsula. More recently, Manfred Bietak and James K. Hoffmeier have argued for an identification with the Ballah Lakes. Hoffmeier equates yam suph with the Egyptian term pa-tjufy (also written p3 ṯwfy) from the Ramesside period, which refers to lakes in the eastern Nile delta. He also describes references to p3 ṯwfy in the context of the Island of Amun, thought to be modern Tell el-Balamun. Reeds tolerant of salt water flourish in the shallow string of lakes extending from Suez north to the Mediterranean Sea, which Kenneth Kitchen argues are acceptable locations for yam suph.

More conjecturally, it has also been suggested that suph may be related to the Hebrew suphah ("storm") or soph ("end"), referring to the events of the Reed/Red Sea escape itself:

The crossing of the sea signaled the end of the sojourn in Egypt and it certainly was the end of the Egyptian army that pursued the fleeing Hebrews (Ex 14:23-29; 15:4-5). After this event at Yam Suph, perhaps the verb Soph, meaning "destroy" and "come to an end," originated (cf. Amos 3:15; Jer 8:13; Isa 66:17; Psa 73:19). Another possible development of this root is the word suphah, meaning "storm-wind"...The meanings "end" and "storm-wind" would have constituted nice puns on the event that took place at the Yam Suph.

== Occurrences ==
(The following translations are used in this section: KJV, Authorized King James Version of the Christian Bible; NJPS, New Jewish Publication Society of America Version of the Tanakh; SET, 'Stone Edition Tanach' from Mesorah Publications Ltd. Brooklyn, New York. The Greek Septuagint translation is ἐρυθρά θάλασσα, "red sea", except where indicated below).

The occurrences of the term are as follows:

End of the eighth Plagues of Egypt:

- KJV: "And the LORD turned a mighty strong west wind, which took away the locusts, and cast them into the Red sea; there remained not one locust in all the coasts of Egypt."
- other translations: Exodus 10:19
- NJPS: "The LORD caused a shift to a very strong west wind, which lifted the locusts, and hurled them into the Sea of Reeds; not a single locust remained in all the territory of Egypt."
- SET: turned back a very powerful west wind and it carried the locust-swarm and hurled it toward the Sea of Reeds; not a single locust remained within the entire border of Egypt."

=== Exodus 13:18 ===
Prologue to The Exodus:

- KJV: "But God led the people about, through the way of the wilderness of the Red sea: and the children of Israel went up harnessed out of the land of Egypt."
- other translations: Exodus 13:18
- NJPS: "So God led the people roundabout, by way of the wilderness at the Sea of Reeds. Now the Israelites went up armed out of the land of Egypt."
- SET: "So God turned the people toward the way of the Wilderness to the Sea of Reeds. The Children of Israel were armed when they went up from the land of Egypt."

=== Exodus 15:4 ===
The Passage of the Red Sea. After the pursuing Egyptians have been drowned in "the waters" of "the sea":

- KJV: "Pharaoh's chariots and his host hath he cast into the sea: his chosen captains also are drowned in the Red sea."
- other translations: Exodus 15:4
- NJPS: "Pharaoh's chariots and his army he has cast into the sea: and the pick of his officers are drowned in the Sea of Reeds."
- SET: "Pharaoh's chariots and army He threw in the sea, and the pick of his officers were mired in the Sea of Reeds."

=== Exodus 15:22 ===
The Exodus continues:

- KJV: "So Moses brought Israel from the Red sea, and they went out into the wilderness of Shur; and they went three days in the wilderness, and found no water."
- other translations: Exodus 15:22
- NJPS: "Then Moses caused Israel to set out from the Sea of Reeds. They went on into the wilderness of Shur; they traveled three days in the wilderness and found no water."
- SET: "Moses caused Israel to journey from the Sea of Reeds and they went out to the Wilderness of Shur; they went for a three-day period in the Wilderness, but they did not find water. "

=== Exodus 23:31 ===
During God's further instruction to Moses after the Ten Commandments:

- KJV: "And I will set thy bounds from the Red sea even unto the sea of the Philistines, and from the desert unto the river: for I will deliver the inhabitants of the land into your hand; and thou shalt drive them out before thee."
- other translations: Exodus 23:31
- NJPS: "And I will set your borders from the Sea of Reeds to the Sea of Philistia, and from the wilderness to the Euphrates: for I will deliver the inhabitants of the land into your hands; and you will drive them out before you."
- SET: "I shall set your border from the Sea of Reeds to the Sea of the Philistines. "

=== Numbers 14:25 ===
In the wilderness, before the conquest of Canaan:

- KJV: "(Now the Amalekites and the Canaanites dwelt in the valley.) Tomorrow turn you, and get you into the wilderness by the way of the Red sea."
- Other translations: Numbers 14:25
- NJPS: "Now the Amalekites and the Canaanites occupy the valleys. Start out, then, tomorrow, and march into the wilderness by way of the Sea of Reeds."
- SET: "And HASHEM said, “... The Amalekite and the Canaanite dwell in the valley - tomorrow, turn and journey toward the Wilderness in the direction of the Sea of Reeds.”"

The New King James Version translates "the Way of the Red Sea" (capitalized) at each occurrence, suggesting that the Israelites may have used an ancient trade route, but this is not reflected in other English translations and the Cambridge Bible for Schools and Colleges argues that 'no definite road is meant'.

=== Numbers 21:4 ===
Just after the death of Aaron:

- KJV: "And they journeyed from mount Hor by the way of the Red sea, to compass the land of Edom: and the soul of the people was much discouraged because of the way."
- other translations: Numbers 21:4
- NJPS: "They set out from Mount Hor by the way of the Sea of Reeds, to skirt the land of Edom. But the people grew restive on the journey,"
- SET: "They journeyed from Mount Hor by way of the Sea of Reeds to go around the land of Edom, and the spirit of the people grew short on the way."

=== Numbers 33:10–11 ===
Continuing the wanderings in the Wilderness:

- KJV: "(10) And they removed from Elim, and encamped by the Red sea. (11) And they removed from the Red sea, and encamped in the wilderness of Sin."
- other translations: Numbers 33:10–11
- NJPS: "(10) They set out from Elim, and encamped by the Sea of Reeds. (11) They set out from the Sea of Reeds, and encamped in the wilderness of Sin."
- SET: "They journeyed from Elim and encamped by the Sea of Reeds. (11) They journeyed from the Sea of Reeds and encamped in the Wilderness of Sin."

=== Deuteronomy 1:1 ===
The opening verse of the book of Deuteronomy has an occurrence of Suph on its own. Some translations, including the Septuagint, have taken this as an abbreviation for the full form, others not:

- KJV: "These be the words which Moses spake unto all Israel on this side Jordan in the wilderness, in the plain over against the Red sea, between Paran, and Tophel, and Laban, and Hazeroth, and Dizahab."
- other translations: Deuteronomy 1:1
- NJPS: "These are the words that Moses addressed to all Israel on the other side of the Jordan. — Through the wilderness, in the Arabah near Suph, between Paran, and Tophel, Laban, and Hazeroth, and Di-zahab,"
- SET: "These are the words that Moses spoke to all Israel, on the other side of the Jordan, concerning the Wilderness, concerning the Arabah, opposite the Sea of Reeds, between Paran and Tophel, and Laban, and Hazeroth, and Di-zahab; eleven days from Horeb, by way of Mount Seir to Kadesh-barnea."

=== Deuteronomy 1:40 ===
Moses reviews the strategy after the initial failure to invade Canaan.

- KJV: "But as for you, turn you, and take your journey into the wilderness by the way of the Red sea."
- other translations: Deuteronomy 1:40
- NJPS: "As for you, turn about, and march into the wilderness by the way of the Sea of Reeds."
- SET: "And as for you, turn yourselves around and journey to the Wilderness, by way of the Sea of Reeds."

=== Deuteronomy 2:1 ===
As above:

- KJV: "Then we turned, and took our journey into the wilderness by the way of the Red sea, as the LORD spake unto me: and we compassed mount Seir many days."
- other translations: Deuteronomy 2:1
- NJPS: "Thus, after you had remained at Kadesh all that long time, we marched back into the wilderness by the way of the Sea of Reeds, as the LORD had spoken to me: and skirted the hill country of Seir a long time. "
- SET: "We turned and jouneyed to the Wilderness toward the Sea of Reeds, as HASHEM spoke to me, and we circled Mount Seir for many days. "

=== Deuteronomy 11:4 ===
Looking back on the events of the Exodus:

- KJV: "And what he did unto the army of Egypt, unto their horses, and to their chariots; how he made the water of the Red sea to overflow them as they pursued after you, and how the LORD hath destroyed them unto this day;"
- other translations: Deuteronomy 11:4
- NJPS: "what He did to Egypt’s army, its horses and chariots; how the LORD rolled back upon them the waters of the Sea of Reeds when they were pursuing you, thus destroying them once and for all;"
- SET: "and what He did to the army of Egypt, to its horses and its chariots, over whom He swept the waters of the Sea of Reeds when they pursued you, and HASHEM caused them to perish until this day; "

=== Joshua 2:10 ===
Testimony of Rahab to Joshua's spies before the conquest of Jericho:

- KJV: "For we have heard how the LORD dried up the water of the Red sea for you, when ye came out of Egypt; and what ye did unto the two kings of the Amorites, that were on the other side Jordan, Sihon and Og, whom ye utterly destroyed."
- other translations: Joshua 2:10
- NJPS: "For we have heard how the LORD dried up the water of the Sea of Reeds for you, when you left Egypt; and what you did to Sihon and Og, the two Amorite kings across the Jordan, whom you doomed."
- SET: "for we have heard how HASHEM dried up the waters of the Sea of Reeds for you when you went forth from Egypt and what you did to the two kings of the Amorites who were across the Jordan - to Sihon and to Og - whom you utterly destroyed."

=== Joshua 4:23 ===
Joshua’s speech to the troops shortly before the conquest of Jericho:

- KJV: "For the LORD your God dried up the waters of Jordan from before you, until ye were passed over, as the LORD your God did to the Red sea, which he dried up from before us, until we were gone over:"
- other translations: Joshua 4:23
- NJPS: "For the LORD your God dried up the waters of the Jordan before you, until you crossed, just as the LORD your God did to the Sea of Reeds, which He dried up before us, until we crossed."
- SET: "For HASHEM, your God, dried up the waters of the Jordan before you until you crossed, as HASHEM, your God, did to the Sea of Reeds, which He dried up before us until we crossed."

=== Joshua 24:6 ===
In Joshua’s final speech to the Israelites:

- KJV: "And I brought your fathers out of Egypt: and ye came unto the sea; and the Egyptians pursued after your fathers with chariots and horsemen unto the Red sea."
- other translations: Joshua 24:6
- NJPS: "— I freed your fathers — from Egypt, and you came to the Sea. But the Egyptians pursued your fathers to the Sea of Reeds with chariots and horsemen."
- SET: "I brought your forefathers out of Egypt and you arrived at the sea. The Egyptians pursued your forefathers with chariot and horsemen to the Sea of Reeds."

=== 1 Kings 9:26 ===
King Solomon’s fleet:

- KJV: "And king Solomon made a navy of ships in Eziongeber, which is beside Eloth, on the shore of the Red sea, in the land of Edom."
- other translations: 1 Kings 9:26
- The Septuagint here has ἐπὶ τοῦ χείλους τῆς ἐσχάτης θαλάσσης, meaning "on the shore of the extremity of the sea"
- NJPS: "King Solomon also built a fleet of ships at Ezion-geber, which is near Eloth on the shore of the Sea of Reeds in the land of Edom."
- SET: "King Solomon made a fleet in Ezion-geber, which is near Eloth, on the coast of the Sea of Reeds, in the land of Edom."

=== Jeremiah 49:21 ===
Jeremiah bemoaned his own fate. Why had he been the one chosen to not only foretell the horrors of destruction but to witness them, and even to be at the mercy of the brethren he had tried to save? But there is no doubt that the exiled Jews in Babylon found strength in his prophecy that there would be redemption and glory seventy years after the destruction of Jerusalem and the Temple. Jeremiah did not live to see his prophecy fulfilled, but many of those who had heard his prophecies were among the ones who returned with Ezra and Nehemiah to inaugurate the Second Temple.

- KJV: "The earth is moved at the noise of their fall, at the cry the noise thereof was heard in the Red sea."
- other translations: Jeremiah 49:21
- NJPS: "At the sound of their downfall The earth shall shake; The sound of screaming Shall be heard at the Sea of Reeds."
- A translation of this text does not occur at this point in the Septuagint. An approximate correspondence is found at Jeremiah 29:21, referring to just "the sea".
- SET: "(20) Therefore, hear the counsel of HASHEM that He has devised against Edom, and His thoughts that he has conceived against the dwellers of Teman: the youngest of the flock will indeed drag them off; he will indeed devastate their pasture. (21) From the sound of their fall the earth quakes; a cry, at the Sea of Reeds their voice is heard."

=== Psalms 106:7–9 ===
God's presence and lovingkindness are always near; one need but have open eyes and an open heart to see them:

- KJV: "(7) Our fathers understood not thy wonders in Egypt; they remembered not the multitude of thy mercies; but provoked him at the sea, even at the Red sea. (8) Nevertheless he saved them for his name's sake, that he might make his mighty power to be known. (9) He rebuked the Red sea also, and it was dried up: so he led them through the depths, as through the wilderness."
- other translations: Psalms 106:7–9
- NJPS: "(7) Our forefathers in Egypt did not perceive Your wonders; they did not remember Your abundant love, but rebelled at the sea, at the Sea of Reeds. (8) Yet He saved them, as befits His name, to make known His might. (9) He sent is blast against the Sea of Reeds; it became dry; he led them through the deep, as through a wilderness."
- SET: "(7) Our fathers in Egypt did not contemplate Your wonders, they were not mindful of Your abundant kindness, and they rebelled by the sea, at the Sea of Reeds. (8) But He saved them for His Name's sake, to make known His might. (9) He roared at the Sea of Reeds and it became dry, and He led them through the depths as through a desert. "

=== Psalms 106:22 ===
God's presence and lovingkindness are always near; one need but have open eyes and an open heart to see them:

- KJV: "Wondrous works in the land of Ham, and terrible things by the Red sea."
- other translations: Psalms 106:22
- NJPS: "wondrous deeds in the land of Ham, awesome deeds at the Sea of Reeds."
- SET: "wondrous works in the land of Ham, awesome things by the Sea of Reeds."

=== Psalms 136:13–15 ===
A song of God's creation and rulership of the world in general and Israel in particular:

- KJV: "(13) To him which divided the Red sea into parts: for his mercy endureth for ever: (14) And made Israel to pass through the midst of it: for his mercy endureth for ever: (15) But overthrew Pharaoh and his host in the Red sea: for his mercy endureth for ever."
- other translations: Psalms 136:13–15
- NJPS: "(13) Who split apart the Sea of Reeds, His steadfast love is eternal; (14) and made Israel pass through it, His steadfast love is eternal; (15) Who hurled Pharaoh and his army into the Sea of Reeds, His steadfast love is eternal;"
- SET: "(13) To Him Who divided the Sea of Reeds into parts, for His kindness endures forever; (14) and caused Israel to pass through it, for His kindness endures forever; (15) and threw Pharaoh and his army into the Sea of Reeds, for His kindness endures forever."

=== Nehemiah 9:9 ===
After the Second Temple was rebuilt (349 BCE), Nehemiah was one of the 120 members of the Men of the Great Assembly, a council which functioned over several generations and rejuvenated the Jewish Nation. They prayed successfully against Idolatry, composed the standard Jewish prayers and brought about the dramatic flowering of the Oral law, the primary repository of divine wisdom (see: Tanakh).

- KJV: "And didst see the affliction of our fathers in Egypt, and heardest their cry by the Red sea;"
- other translations: Nehemiah 9:9
- NJPS: "You took note of our fathers’ affliction in Egypt, and heard their cry at the Sea of Reeds;"
- SET: "You observed the suffering of our forefathers in Egypt, and You heard their outcry at the Sea of Reeds. "

== See also ==
- Crossing the Red Sea
- Transjordan in the Bible
- Erythraean Sea
- Sea of Suf in Mandaeism
