= Arsinoe (Gulf of Suez) =

Ancient city on the Gulf of Suez

Arsinoe (Ancient Greek: Ἀρσινόη) or Arsinoites or Cleopatris (Ancient Greek: Κλεοπατρίς) or Cleopatra, was an ancient city at the northern extremity of the Heroopolite Gulf (Gulf of Suez), in the Red Sea.

== History ==
Arsinoe was the capital of the Heroopolite nome, and one of the principal harbors belonging to Egypt. It appears to have been also denominated Cleopatris (Strabo p. 780) and Arsinoites (Plin. v. 9. § 9; Orelli, Inscr. 516). It is also conjectured to have stood on the site of the biblical Pi-hahiroth (Pihachiroth). Exodus 14:2, 9; Numbers 33:7; Winer, Biblioth. Realwörterb. ii. p. 309. The modern Ardscherúd, a village near Suez, corresponds to this Arsinoe. It was seated near the eastern termination of the Royal canal, which communicated with the Pelusiac branch of the Nile, and which Ptolemy Philadelphus carried on from the Bitter Lakes to the head of the Heroopolite gulf. Arsinoe (Plin. v. 12) was ca. 200 km from Pelusium.

The revenues of the Arsinoite nome were presented by that monarch to his wife (who was also his sister), Arsinoe II of Egypt, after whom the city was named, and remained the property of successive queens or princesses of the Lagid family, including one of the Cleopetras who changed the name into Cleopatris. The shortness of the road across the eastern desert and its position near the canal were the principal advantages of Arsinoe as a staple of trade. But although it possessed a capacious bay, its access from the south was difficult due to the prevailing northern winds. Arsinoe, accordingly, was less eligibly situated for the Indian traffic than either Myos Hormos or Berenice.
