= Seleucus (commandant) =

Seleucus (Greek: Σέλευκος Seleukos) was in 30 BC a commandant of the eastern Egyptian border-fortress Pelusium.

In the final stage of the decisive war between Mark Antony and Octavian for the sole rule of the Roman Empire Antony and his lover, the Egyptian queen Cleopatra VII, withdrew after their defeat in the Battle of Actium (September 2, 31 BC) to Egypt. In summer of 30 BC Octavian's troops advanced from the West and the East against Egypt. At that time Seleucus was the commandant of Pelusium. But this eastern border-fortress surrendered so fast that Seleucus was suspected of having treacherously handed it over. The ancient biographer Plutarch also mentions the rumour that Seleucus had given it up with the consent of Cleopatra, but this assertion is doubted in the modern research. In any case the queen handed over Seleucus's wife and children to Antony for execution. If the family members of Seleucus were really executed is unknown. There is also no information about the further fate of Seleucus.
