= Mount Casius =

Mount Casius or Mount Kasios or Mount Kasion may refer to:

- Jebel Aqra, a mountain near the mouth of the Orontes River on the Syrian–Turkish border
- Ras Kouroun, a small mountain near Lake Bardawil in Egypt
