= Parting of the Red Sea =

Part of the biblical narrative of the Exodus

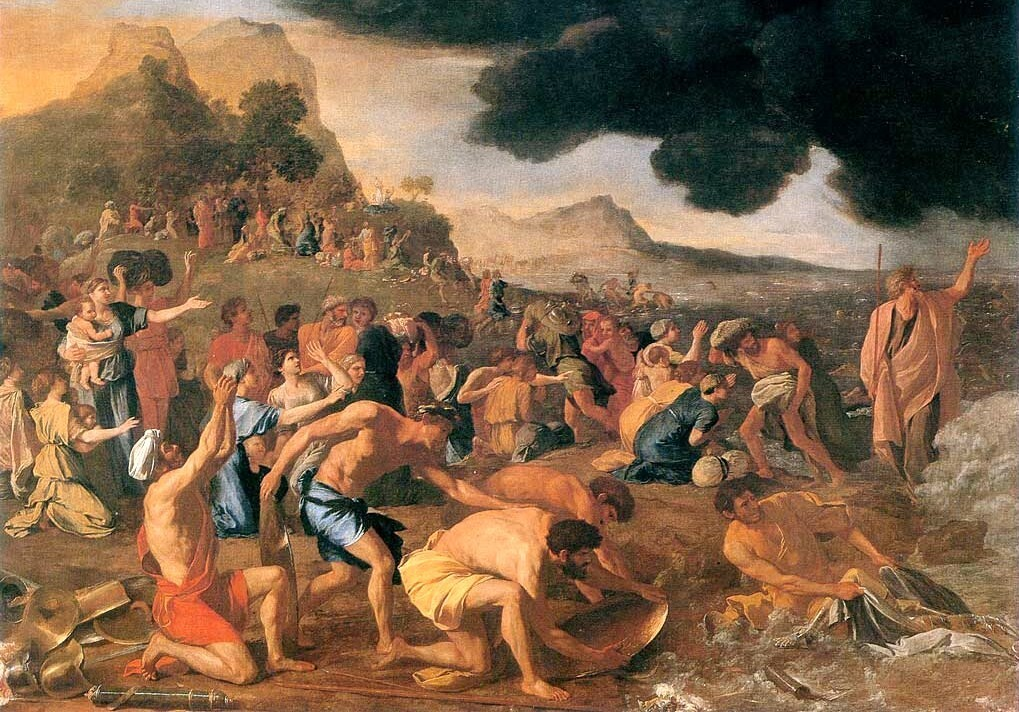
The Crossing of the Red Sea, by Nicolas Poussin (1633–34)

The Parting of the Red Sea or Crossing of the Red Sea (Hebrew: קריעת ים סוף, romanized: Kriat Yam Suph, lit. "parting of the sea of reeds") is an episode in The Exodus, a foundational story in the Hebrew Bible.

It tells of the escape of the Israelites, led by Moses, from the pursuing Egyptians, as recounted in the Book of Exodus. Moses holds out his staff and God parts the waters of the Yam Suph, which is traditionally presumed to be the Red Sea, although other interpretations have arisen. With the water dispersed, the Israelites were able to walk on dry ground and cross the sea, followed by the Egyptian army. Once the Israelites have safely crossed, Moses drops his staff, closing the sea, and drowning the pursuing Egyptians.

== Biblical narrative ==
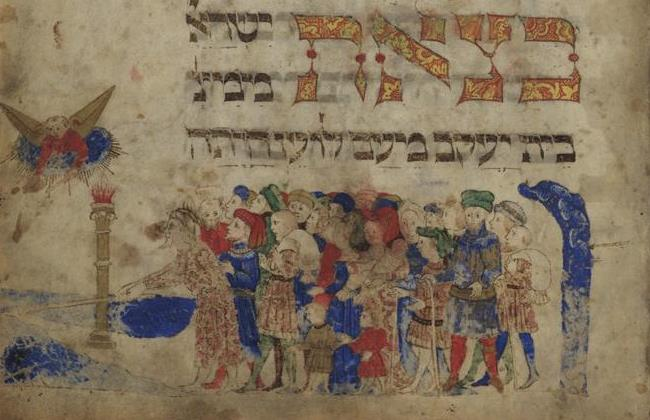
Crossing the Red Sea, Rothschild Haggadah, ca. 1450

After the Plagues of Egypt, the Pharaoh agrees to let the Israelites go, and they travel from Ramesses to Succoth. Ramesses is generally identified with modern Qantir, the site of the 19th dynasty capital Pi-Ramesses, and Succoth with Tell el-Maskhuta in Wadi Tumilat, the biblical Land of Goshen. From Succoth, the Israelites travel to Etham "on the edge of the desert", led by a pillar of cloud by day and a pillar of fire by night. There God tells Moses to turn back and camp by the sea at Pi-HaHiroth, between Migdol and the sea, directly opposite Baal-zephon. None of these latter locations have been identified with certainty.

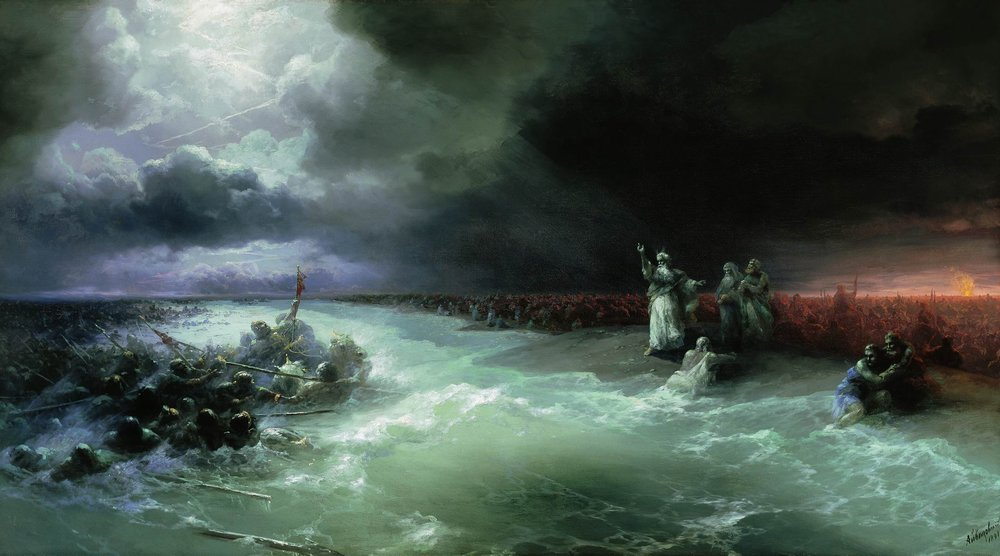
Passage of the Jews through the Red Sea (1891), by Ivan Aivazovsky

God causes the Pharaoh to pursue the Israelites with chariots, and the pharaoh overtakes them at Pi-hahiroth. When the Israelites see the Egyptian army they are afraid, but the pillar of fire and the cloud separates the Israelites and the Egyptians. At God's command, Moses held his Staff out over the water, water parted, and the Israelites walked through on dry land with a wall of water on either side (Exodus 14:21&22). The Egyptians pursued them, but at daybreak God clogged their chariot-wheels and threw them into a panic, and with the return of the water, the pharaoh and his entire army are destroyed. When the Israelites saw the power of God, they put their faith in God and in Moses, and sang a song of praise to the Lord for the crossing of the sea and the destruction of their enemies. (This song, at Exodus 15, is called the Song of the Sea).

According to Soggin's documentary hypothesis, the narrative contains at least three and possibly four layers. In the first layer (the oldest), God blows the sea back with a strong east wind, allowing the Israelites to cross on dry land; in the second, Moses stretches out his hand and the waters part into two walls; in the third, God clogs the chariot wheels of the Egyptians and they flee (in this version the Egyptians do not even enter the water); and in the fourth, the Song of the Sea, God casts the Egyptians into tehomot, the oceanic depths or mythical abyss.

=== In Islam ===
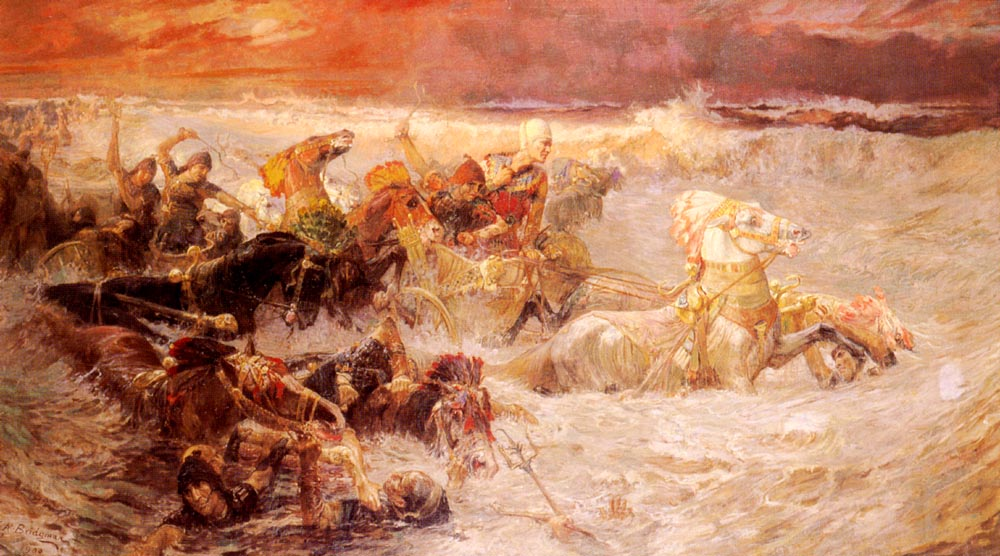
Pharaoh's army engulfed by the Red Sea, by Frederick Arthur Bridgman (1900)

The incident of the Egyptian tyrant Pharaoh chasing down Moses and the Israelites, followed by the drowning in the sea, is mentioned in several places in the Quran. As per God's command, Moses came to the court of Pharaoh to warn him for his transgressions. Mūsā clearly manifested the proof of prophethood and claimed to let Israelites go with him. The Magicians of Pharaoh's cities, whom he gathered to prove to the people that the person claiming to be prophet is a magician; eventually they all believed in Moses. This enraged Pharaoh. But he couldn't frighten them in any way. Later they were pursued by Pharaoh and his army at sunrise. But God revealed to Moses beforehand to leave with His servants at night, for they will be pursued. The Quranic account about the moment:

When the two groups came face to face, the companions of Moses cried out, "We are overtaken for sure." [Moses] said, "No! Indeed, with me is my Lord; He will guide me." So We inspired Moses: "Strike the sea with your staff," and the sea was split, each part was like a huge mountain.

— Quran 26:61-63

Miraculously, God divided the waters of the sea leaving a dry path in the middle, which the Children of Israel immediately followed. Pharaoh and his soldiers went so audacious as to chase the Children of Israel into the sea. Nevertheless, this miracle did not suffice to convince Pharaoh. Together with his soldiers who took him as a deity (by obeying him against the prophet of God), he blindly entered the path that divided the sea. However, after the Children of Israel had safely crossed to the other side, the waters suddenly began to close in on Pharaoh and his soldiers and they all drowned. Though, at the last moment Pharaoh tried to repent but Jibreel put mud in his mouth and his repentance was not accepted:

We brought the tribe of Israel across the sea and Pharaoh and his troops pursued them out of tyranny and enmity. Then, when he was on the point of drowning, he (Pharaoh) said, "I believe that there is no god but Him in Whom the tribe of Israel believe. I am one of the Muslims (those who submit to God's will)." What, now! When previously you rebelled and were one of the corrupters? Today We will preserve your body so you can be a Sign for people who come after you. Surely many people are heedless of Our Signs.

— Quran 10:90-92

=== Legacy ===
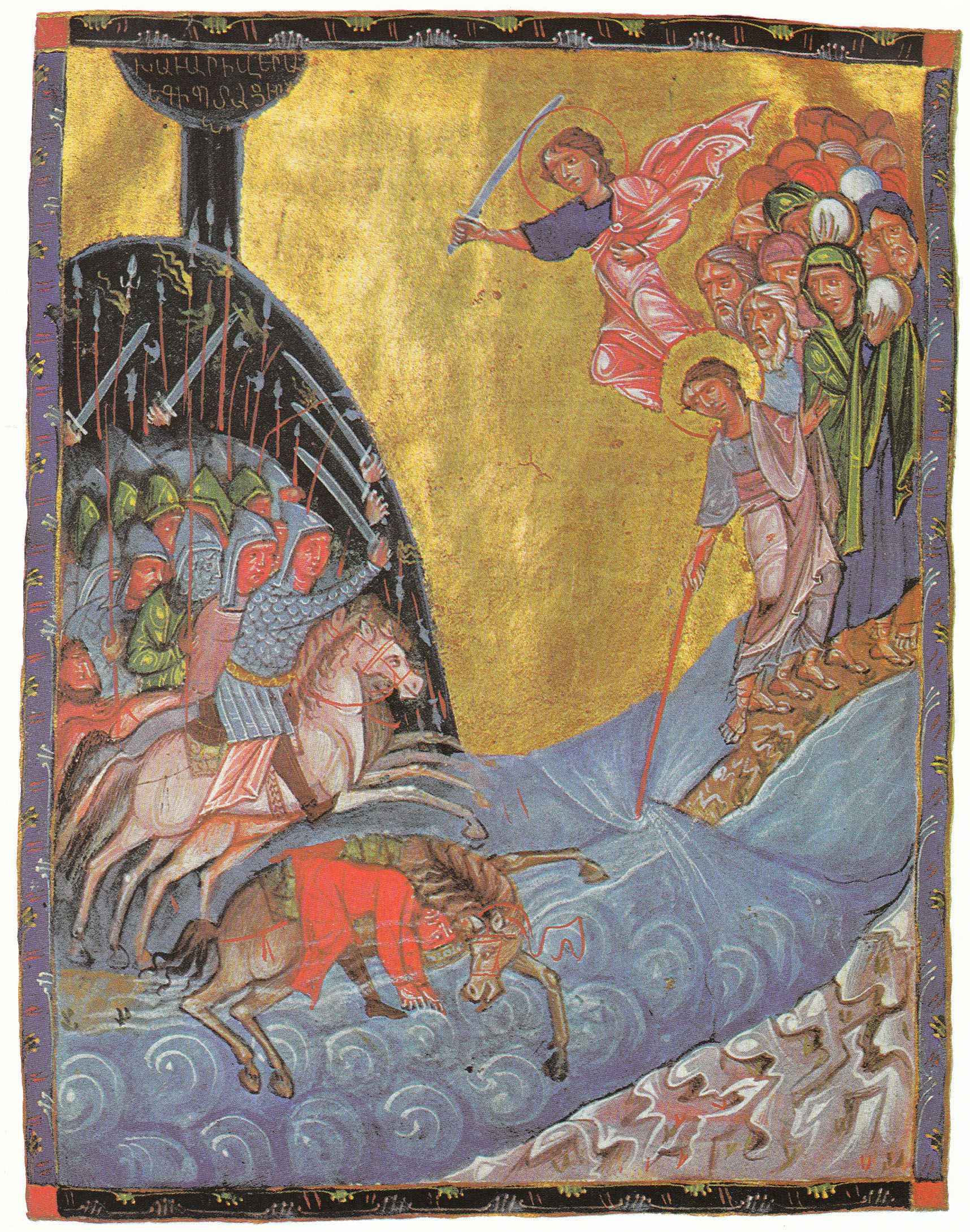
The Passage of the Red Sea Manuscript by Toros Roslin, 1266

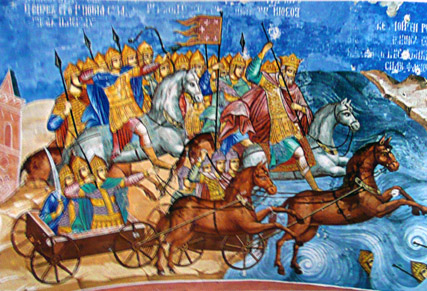
Crossing the Red Sea, a wall painting from the 1640s in Yaroslavl, Russia

The theme of Moses crossing the Red Sea was taken up by the panegyrists of Constantine the Great and applied to the battle of the Milvian Bridge (312). The theme enjoyed a vogue during the fourth century on carved sarcophagi: at least twenty-nine have survived in full or in fragments. Eusebius of Caesarea cast Maxentius, drowned in the Tiber, in the role of Pharaoh, both in his Ecclesiastical History and in his eulogistic Life of Constantine.

Every year, Muslims fast two days in the month of Muharram commemorating the event.

== Theories and historicity ==
No clear archaeological evidence has been found that directly supports the story of Exodus, other than the biblical account. Zahi Hawass, an Egyptian archaeologist and formerly Egypt's Minister of State for Antiquities Affairs, says: "Really, it's a myth... Sometimes as archaeologists we have to say that never happened because there is no historical evidence." Despite the lack of evidence, some have created theories as to what may have inspired the biblical authors' narrative, providing natural explanations.

=== Crossing location ===
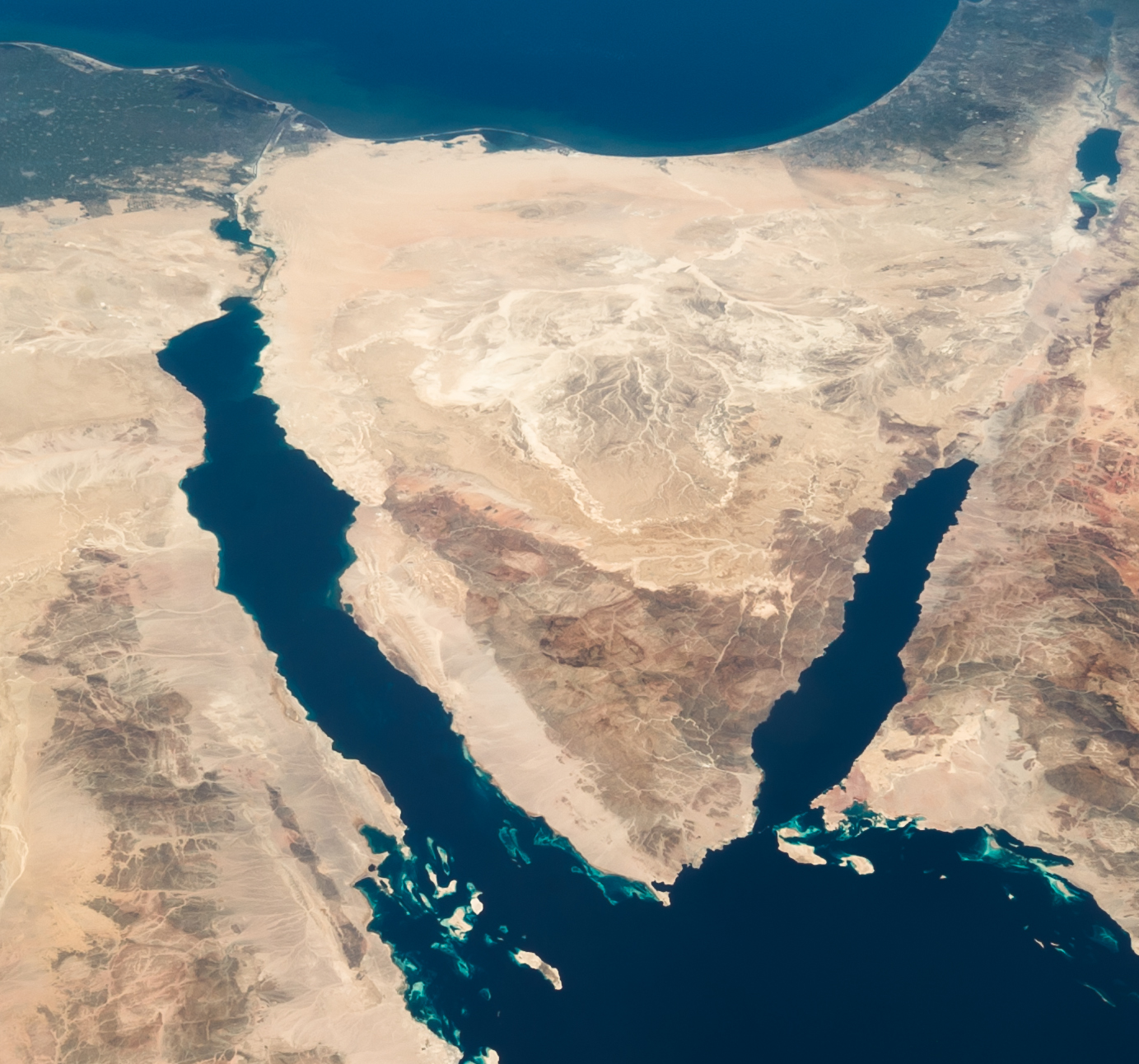
Satellite overview of the relevant bodies of water

The Hebrew term for the body of water that the Israelites crossed is Yam Suph. In Exodus 2:3-5, Isaiah 19:6-7, and Jonah 2:5, suph is translated as reeds, rushes, marshes, or weeds. A fair rendering of the Hebrew would therefore be "sea/lake of reeds". This literal translation is attested by Coptic Bohairic translations, Aramaic Targums, Martin Luther, John Calvin, and C. F. Keil, although it has been challenged by Bernard Batto. In the Septuagint, Jews who lived in Alexandria, Egypt, during the 3rd century BC, translated Yam Suph in Exodus as the Greek Ἐρυθρὰ θάλασσα (Eruthra Thalassa or Erythraean Sea), where Eruthra literally means "Red". This is a historicized translation, not a direct translation, as suph in Hebrew does not mean "red". The Septuagint mainly translates yam suph as the Erythraean Sea, but exceptions include I Kings 9:26 (ἐσχάτης θαλάσσης, eschátis thalássis or "the end of the sea"), Jeremiah 49:21 (thalassi'), and Judges 11:16 (thalasses siph). The Erythraean Sea is translated in the Latin Vulgate and modern English translations as the Red Sea, but in classical sources the Erythraean Sea often referred to the northwestern part of the Indian Ocean in general, including the modern Red Sea, the Gulf of Aden, the Gulf of Aqaba, the Arabian Sea, and sometimes the Persian Gulf. Most maps depicted these bodies of water with grossly distorted proportions, omitting gulfs and other features altogether, and Greco-Roman writers used only imprecise allusions. The salt-water reeds suggested by yam suf flourished in many shallow lakes and marshes around these areas. Snaith suggests that these are vague terms and Hoffmeier concludes one should be cautious in relying on them to settle the crossing location. The modern Red Sea as crossing site of the Israelites is especially popular among believers in the miraculous nature of the Exodus. Biblical literalist Ken Ham states "there is no need to come up with a naturalistic explanation of a supernatural event. The Bible gives us a record from the ultimate Eyewitness, the God of Creation. [...] We must be careful to avoid limiting our faith to only those acts of God that we can explain according to the laws of the physical world. He miraculously created those physical laws, and He can miraculously use them or override them as He chooses."

Many sites have been proposed. In 1896, Haynes proposed that the body of water crossed was Lake Timsah, a salt lake north of the Gulf of Suez, and the nearest large body of water after Wadi Tumilat. Lake Timsah was connected to Pithom in Gesem at various times by a canal, and a late 1st millennium text refers to Migdol Baal Zephon as a fort on the canal. Schleiden and Brugsch proposed Sirbonis Lake. Kenneth Kitchen and James Hoffmeier support the isthmus of Suez north to the Mediterranean Sea. Hoffmeier equates yam suf with the Egyptian term pa-tjufy (also written p3 twfy) from the Ramesside period, which refers to lakes in the eastern Nile Delta. He also describes references to p3 twfy in the context of the Island of Amun, thought to be modern Tell el-Balamun, the most northerly city of Pharaonic Egypt, located about 29 km southwest of Damietta. Drews objects that the isthmus is oriented primarily north-south, and consequently, a wind setdown effect with an east wind is not possible. Naum Volzinger and Alexei Androsov believe that a reef running from Egypt to the north side of the Red Sea used to be much closer to the surface at approximately 1500 BC and therefore a crossing in the northern part of the Gulf of Suez is plausible.

Alan Gardiner proposes the northeast Nile Delta, in the "marshy and watery region that now comprises the southern extremity of [Lake] Menzaleh". Carl Drews propose that the Israelites crossed a 3-4 km land bridge along the Lake of Tanis, in the Nile delta. Circa 1250 BC, this lake would have been a shallow, reed-filled brackish lagoon. Ron Wyatt, Lennart Mueller, Bob Cornuke, and Glen Fritz propose Nuweiba Beach in the Gulf of Aqaba. Sir Colin Humphries proposes Elat. Steven Rudd proposes the Straits of Tiran.

=== Volcanic eruption ===
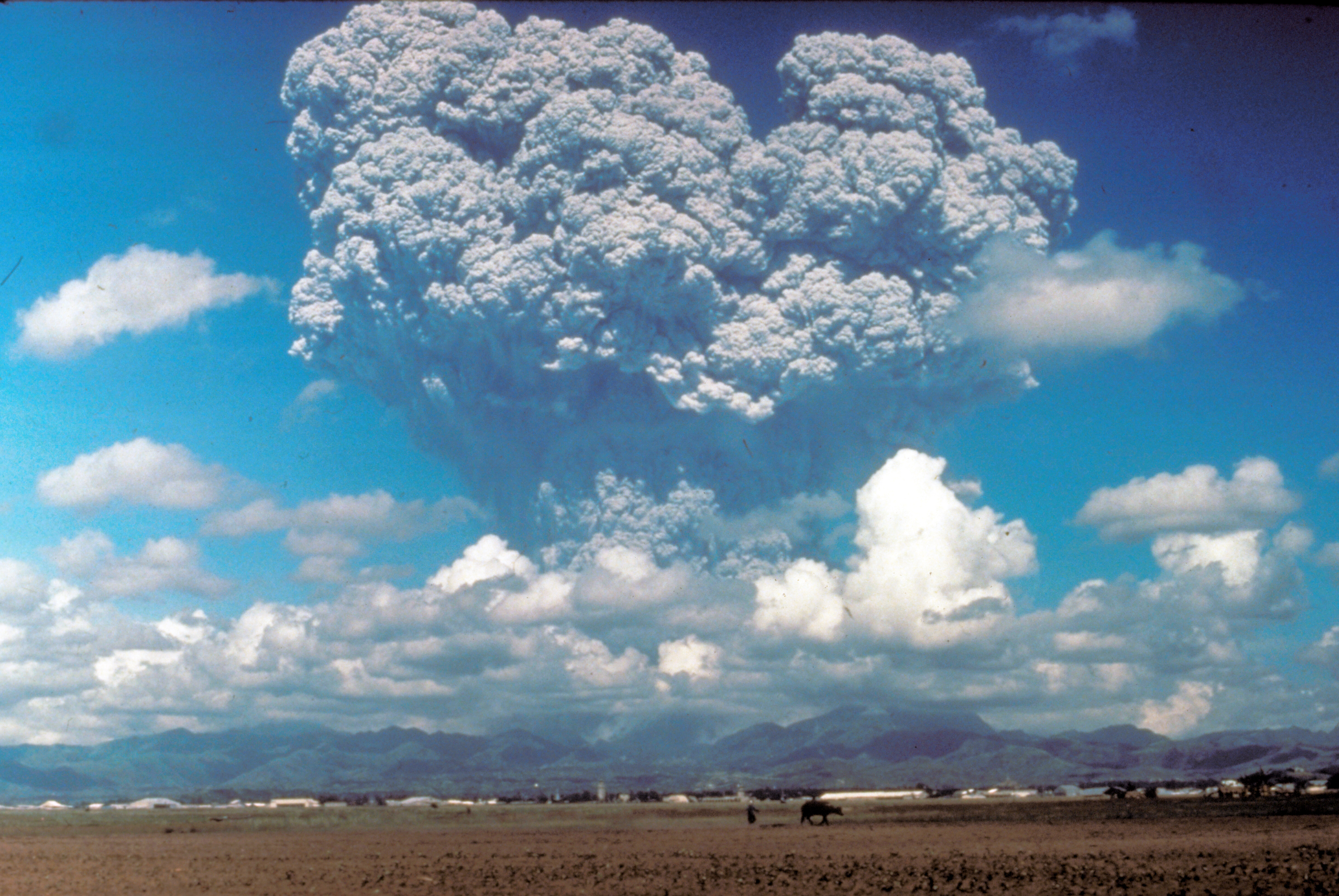
The June 12, 1991 eruption column from Mount Pinatubo

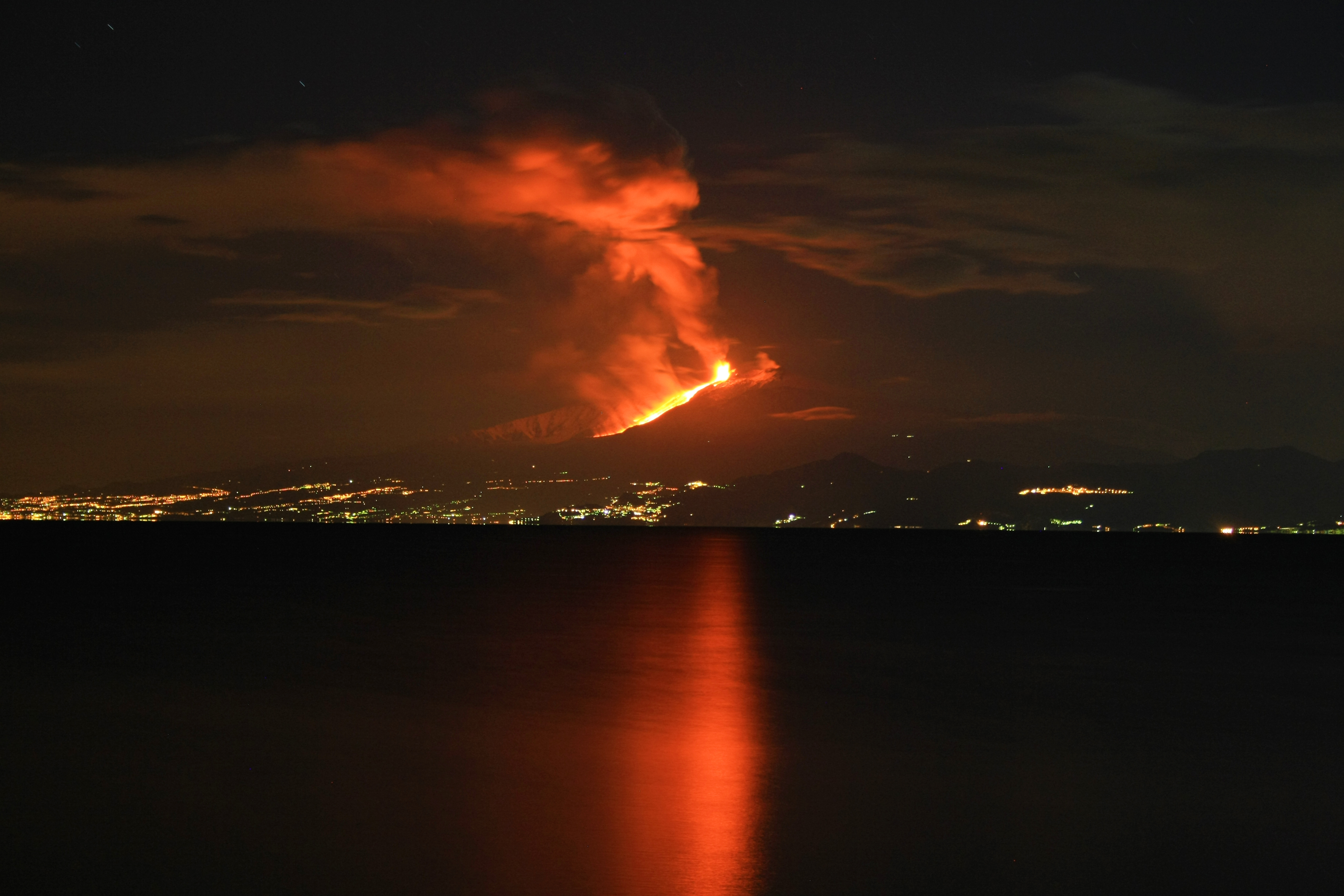
Etna eruption on January 13th 2011 at night.

The Minoan eruption was a catastrophic volcanic eruption known to have devastated the Santorini island circa 1600 BC. There was likely another eruption in the South Aegean Volcanic Arc sometime around 1450 BC. Geologist Barbara J. Sivertsen has proposed a link between these eruptions and the Exodus. The pillar of fire and cloud described in Exodus could easily be a volcanic eruption column, smoky by day and fiery by night. A BBC documentary, Moses, suggested that the Minoan eruption could have triggered a 600ft-high tsunami, travelling at about 400 miles an hour, which would have been 6ft high and a hundred miles long when it reached the Egyptian delta.

=== Wind setdown ===
The Biblical narrative describes a strong east wind. Several researchers have proposed that the land path the Israelites walked on was created by a wind setdown.

=== Mirage effects ===
Fraser has proposed that the waters that "were a wall unto them on their right hand, and on their left" could have been a fata morgana mirage, magnifying and blurring the water on either side of a narrow strip of land and causing it to appear as a solid wall projected in the air. The occurrence of a fata morgana is dependent on a precise combination of winds and temperatures, but could have lasted for the duration of the Israelites' journey through a body of water. Katzper objects that the Egyptians drowned "upon the sea-shore in the sight of Israel", and therefore the crossing cannot be explained solely by optics. McKeighen objects that the crossing occurred during the night, and therefore a mirage would have been difficult to observe. Also, a strong east wind could be incompatible with the exact temperature profile needed.

== See also ==
- The Prince of Egypt
- The Crossing of the Red Sea (Sistine Chapel)
- The Crossing of the Red Sea (Bronzino)
- The Ten Commandments (1956 film)
- Pi-HaHiroth
- Mount Sinai
- Passover
- Ashura
