= Lake Bardawil =

Lagoon on the north coast of the Sinai Peninsula in Egypt

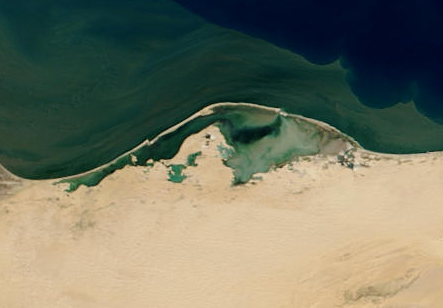
- Satellite Image of Lake Bardawil

- Location within Egypt
- Coordinates: 31.190483°N 33.162231°E
- Basin countries: Egypt
- Surface area: 59,500 ha (147,000 acres)

Ramsar Wetland
- Designated: 9 September 1988
- Reference no.: 407

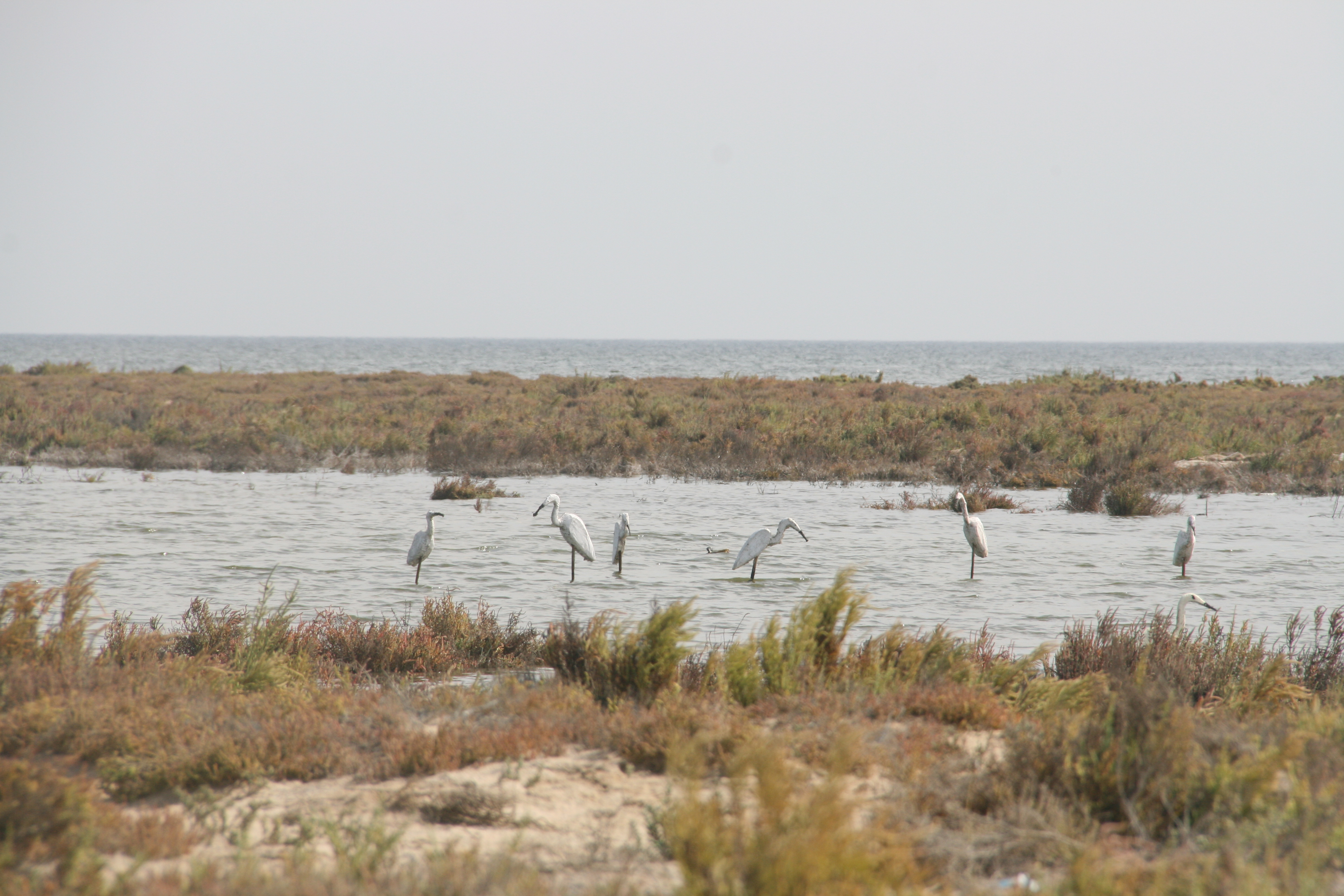
Dummy birds to attract and hunt migrating birds in Lake Bardawil

Lake Bardawil (Arabic: بحيرة البردويل, romanized: Buḥayrat al-Bardawīl or سبخة البردويل Sabḵat al-Bardawīl), is a large, very saline lagoon near the protected of Zaranik (known for its diversity of insects and waterbirds) in Egypt on the north coast of the Sinai Peninsula. Lake Bardawil is about 30 kilometers (19 mi) long, and 14 kilometers (8.7 mi) wide (at its widest). It is considered to be one of the three major lakes of the Sinai Peninsula, along with the Great Bitter Lake and the Little Bitter Lake. It continues to decrease in size as sands move and is becoming more of a playa or sabkha than a lake. Between Port Said and Rafah are three main sabkha which extend from west to east: Sabkhat El Malaha (Lake Fouad), Sabkhat Bardawil (Lake Bardawil) and Sabkhat El Sheikh Zawayed.

The lake is shallow, reaching a depth of about 3 meters, and is separated from the Mediterranean Sea by a narrow sandbar, with the waters of the sea often finding their way inside, making it saline. It has International Ramsar Convention protected wetlands with a large population of little tern. 30% of the recorded species in the Mediterranean Coast of Sinai are in Lake Bardawil. Six threatened species of flora exist at Lake Bardawil, including Iris mariae.

It has six habitats, including open water, wet salt marshes, saline sand flats and hummock (nebkas), stabilized sand dunes, interdune depressions, and mobile sand dunes."

Other than bird diversity, the area is known for sea turtles and bottlenose dolphins; although a high mortality rate among sea turtles has been concerning. In the IUCN Red Data Book of 2006 are 6 threatened plant species which are found near the Lake, these include Astragalus camelorum, Bellevalia salah-eidii, Biorum oliveri, Iris mariae, Lobularia arabica and Salsola tetragona. The first four are endemic species.

Some students of the Hebrew Exodus from Egypt think that this location is near the fourth station of the Exodus, called Pi-Hahiroth, saying that "It may have been just west of the western tip of Lake Bardawil."

It may be what Herodotus described as the Serbonian Bog, between Damietta and Mount Casius, in his Histories of c. 430BCE.

The Bardawil lagoons are named after the Crusader king Baldwin I. Based in Jerusalem, Baldwin raided Egypt in order to secure his kingdom. He fell ill while fishing in the Nile. While being carried back to Jerusalem in 1118 CE, Baldwin died in El-Arish.

During the Sinai and Palestine campaign of World War I, Allied soldiers of the Canterbury Mounted Rifles tried to cut a canal from the sea to the western end of Lake Bardawil in order to flood it and prevent the forces of the Central Powers attacking Romani from the north, but they were unsuccessful.
