= Ras Kouroun =

Promontory in Egypt

Ras Kasaroun
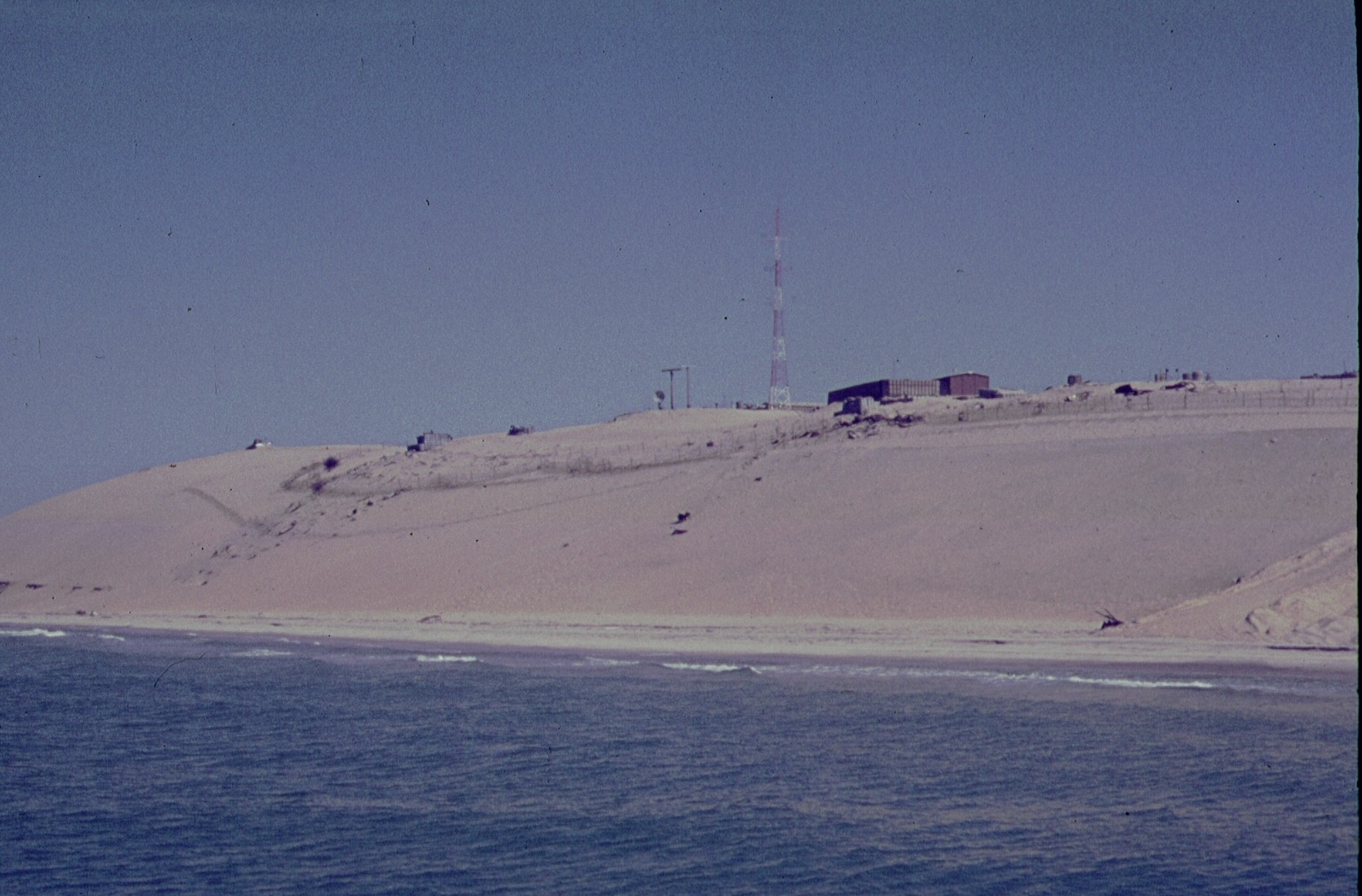

Highest point
- Coordinates: 31°9′34.02″N 33°5′17.53″E

Geography
- Location within Egypt
- Location: Egypt

Ras Kasaroun (Arabic: راس كسرون) or El-Kas (Arabic: القاس), also known as Casius Mons in Latin, or Kasion Oros (Ancient Greek: Κάσιον)

Like the other Mount Casius in Syria, it was historically associated with a shrine to Zeus, one of whose epithets was Kasios.

== History ==
The sandy mount stands out about the flat landscape, though it is a mere 100 metres above the sea.

=== Classical Age ===
==== Persian period ====
To Greek geographers such as Herodotus (who considered it to mark the boundary between Egypt and Syria), is a small mountain and a former town near the marshy Lake Bardawil, the "Serbonian Bog" of Herodotus, where Zeus' ancient opponent Typhon was "said to be hidden".

==== Hellenistic period ====
Here, Greeks knew, Baal Sephon was worshipped.

Its name is given to the Catholic titular see of Casius.

=== Medieval Ages ===
The saying "Kasiotic knot", which in Medieval Greek meant "someone who are crooked in their ways", comes from the town's name.
