= Shata, Egypt =

Shata شطا
- city
- Location in Egypt
- Coordinates: 31.408889°N 31.871944°E
- Country: Egypt
- Governorate: Damietta
- Time zone: UTC+2 (EET)
  - Summer (DST): UTC+3 (EEST)

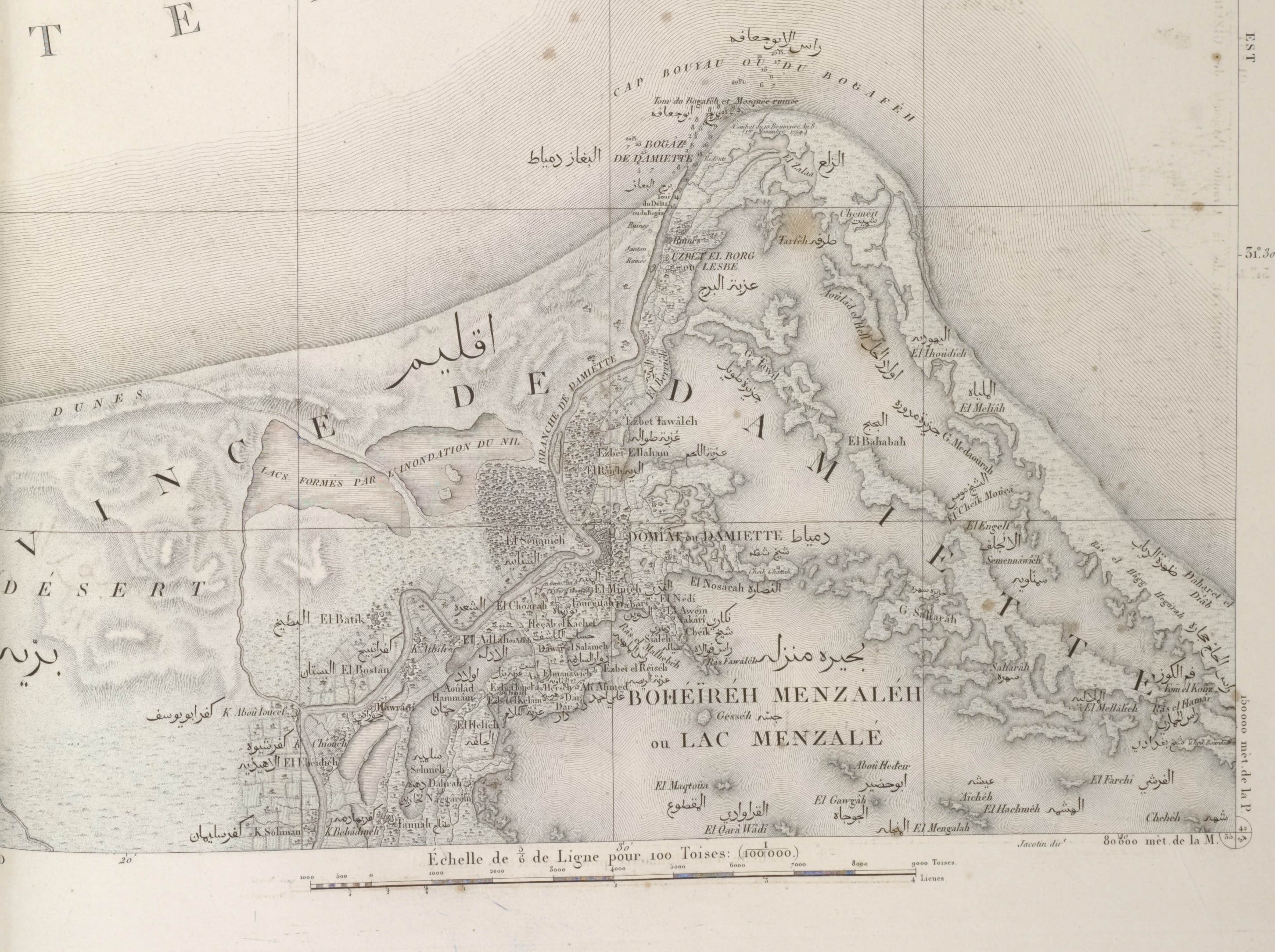
Map of Damietta drawn by French expedition scientists

Shata or Sheikh Shata (Arabic: شطا, Greek: Σάτα) is an old city in Damietta Governorate, Egypt. It lies North East of the Nile Delta on Lake Manzala. The city was famous in Middle Ages for its production of textiles known as "Shatawi" and for producing cover (Kiswah) for Kaaba.
