= Pi-HaHiroth =

Fourth station of the Exodus

Pi-HaHiroth (פִּי הַחִירֹת Pī haḤīrōṯ), is the fourth station of the Exodus mentioned in Exodus 14:2. The fifth and sixth stations Marah and Elim are located on the Red Sea. The biblical books Exodus and Numbers refer to Pi-HaHiroth as the place where the Israelites encamped between Migdol and the sea, opposite Baal Zephon, while awaiting an attack by the Pharaoh, prior to crossing the Red Sea.

== Etymology ==
Some Egyptologists think the name reflects the Egyptian pr-ḥwt-ḥrt, a place mentioned in Papyrus Anastasis III. In fact, part of the mystery can be resolved by understanding the initial syllable ′Pi,′ which corresponds to the Egyptian word Pr or Pi, as House of such as in ′Pithom′ or ′Pi-Ramesses′. The next literary fragment ′Ha′ (ḥwt) would indicate the ′temple′, representing an Egyptian convention beginning with the hieroglyphic pr-ḥwt, “estate of the temple”, while the fact that the name ends with the goddess determinative indicates that the final element, ḥrt, is theophoric.

The Revised Version of the Bible at the first use of the name Pi-HaHiroth has a link to a footnote that says "Or, where the desert tracks begin".

== Identification ==
The Egyptologist David A. Falk suggests that Pi-HaHiroth was located somewhere on the way from the Sea of Reeds (pȜ ṯwfy) towards Pi-Ramesses, based on the description of the site's location in Papyrus Anastasis III. Strong's Concordance simply locates Pi-HaHiroth as 'a place on the eastern border of Egypt'.
