= Serbonian Bog =

Former Egyptian wetland

Coordinates: 31°07′25″N 33°07′06″E

The Serbonian Bog (Greek: Σιρβωνίδος λίμνη, romanized: Sirbōnidos limnē, Latin: Sirbonis Lacus, Arabic: مستنقع سربون, romanized: Mustanqaʿ Sirbūn) was an area of wetland in a lagoon lying between the eastern Nile Delta, the Isthmus of Suez, Mount Casius, and the Mediterranean Sea in Egypt, with Lake Sirbonis at its center. The lagoon still exists, and is the second-largest in Egypt. The bog is used as a metaphor in English for an inextricable situation.

== Sirbonis in classical sources ==
As described by Herodotus, Strabo and other ancient geographers and historians, the Serbonian Bog was a mix of genuine sand bars, quicksand, asphalt (according to Strabo) (Note: According to William Falconer, this was an error resulting from Strabo's conflation of Lake Asphalites (the Dead Sea) with Sirbonis; he notes that Josephus records a district called Silbonitis somewhere between Lake Tiberias and Lake Asphalites, and considers that this similarity of names misled Strabo.) and pits covered with shingle, with a channel running through it to the lake. This gave the wetlands the deceptive appearance of being a lake surrounded by mostly solid land. The place is also called (Greek: Σιρβωνίς, romanized: Sirbōnis or Greek: Σίρβων, romanized: Sirbōn in Greek. The term (Greek: λίμνη, romanized: limnē) in its name can mean "lake", but more usually means a "marshy lake" or mere.

The Serbonian Lake is identified as Lake Bardawil (Sabkhat al Bardawil), on the Sinai Peninsula's north coast. According to Diodorus Siculus, most of the army of the King of Persia was lost there after his successful taking of Sidon in his attempt to restore Egypt to Persian rule. (Note: But the lexicographer William Smith considered this an exaggeration. Smith said the Persian king in question was Darius II Ochus.)

== Uses ==
Beginning with Milton, who used it in his description of Hell, the term Serbonian Bog is applied metaphorically in English to any situation in which one is entangled from which extrication is difficult.

A Gulf profound as that Serbonian bog

Betwixt Damiata and Mount Casius old

Where Armies whole have sunk: the parching Air.

— John Milton, "Paradise Lost", Book II:592-94 (1674)

=== Philosophy & Political Science ===
Edmund Burke used it in his Reflections on the Revolution in France (1790):

"The whole of the power obtained by this revolution will settle in the towns among the burghers and the monied directors who lead them. ... Here end all the deceitful dreams and visions of the equality and rights of men. In 'the Serbonian bog' of this base oligarchy they are all absorbed, sunk, and lost for ever."

Daniel Webster used it in his speech, "The union not a compact" on the force bill, in the United States Senate, February 16th, 1833 (in reply to John C. Calhoun) and Jackson's proclamation to South Carolina, in 1833:

"He is like a strong man struggling in a morass-- every effort to extricate himself only sinks him deeper and deeper. And I fear the resemblance may be carried still further; I feat that no friend can safely come to his relief, that no one can approach near enough to hold out a helping hand, without danger of going down himself also, into the bottomless depths of this Serbonian bog."

=== Economics ===
Milton's description was quoted as the epigraph to the chapter "Markets with non-convex preferences and production" presenting "Quasi-equilibria in markets with non-convex preferences" by Ross Starr in the textbook General Competitive Analysis by Kenneth J. Arrow and Frank H. Hahn.

=== Law ===
In his published opinion in In re Dow, 213 F. 355 (E.D.S.C. 1914), Judge Smith wrote regarding judicial interpretations of the racial prerequisite in the early U.S. naturalization statute: "All of which foregoing discussion may seem wholly out of place in a reasoned legal opinion as to the construction of a statute, except as illustrating the Serbonian bog into which a court or judge will plunge that attempts to make the words 'white persons' conform to any racial classification."

United States Supreme Court Justice Benjamin N. Cardozo used it in a dissenting opinion, stating:

"The attempted distinction between accidental results and accidental means will plunge this branch of the law into a Serbonian Bog."

Justice Dimmick used it in his dissenting opinion in State v. Cameron, 674 P.2d 650 (Wash. 1983). "In Crenshaw we began the odyssey. Today's majority opinion now leads us further into the Serbonian bog.

The Cardozo statement was echoed by another Supreme Court Justice, Sandra Day O'Connor:

"We recognise that any standard requiring Courts to distinguish causes that are "accidents" from causes that are "occurrences" requires drawing a line, and we realise that "reasonable [people] may differ widely as to the place where the line should fall"... We draw this line today only because the language of Article 17 and 18 requires it, and not because of any desire to plunge into the "Serbonian Bog" that accompanies attempts to distinguish between causes that are accidents and injuries that are accidents... Until Article 17 of the Warsaw Convention is changed by the signatories, it cannot be stretched to impose carrier liability for injuries that are not caused by accidents."

United States District Court Judge Joseph E. Irenas stated in another opinion:

Tipping the scales at nearly 157 pages, the complaint hardly comports with the principles of brevity......In addition to being overly long, the complaint is inconsistent and confusing, causing this Court to expend much valuable time in an effort to discern its meaning......There is a strong argument that portions of the complaint fail to comply with the strictures of Fed. R. Civ. and might afford this Court a sufficient basis for dismissal. However, a dismissal without prejudice under Fed. R. Civ. P. 8(a) would only lead to a new filing and needlessly increase the amount of time and money already expended. Thus, the Court will plunge into the complaint's "Serbonian Bog" and deal with the pending Fed. R. Civ. P. 12(b)(6) motions on the merits.

Justice Breyer used it in a dissenting opinion in Texas v. Cobb, 532 U.S. 162, 186 (2001). While serving as a judge on the U.S. Court of Appeals for the First Circuit, he also used the phrase to refer to the state of the law concerning interlocutory appeals from refusals of motions for stays pending arbitration. Hartford Fin. Sys., Inc v. Fla. Software Servs., Inc., 712 F.2d 724, 727 (1st Cir. 1983).

Judge William H. Pauley III (2004): "This court declines the City's invitation to wander into a Serbonian bog before a state court has had the opportunity to illuminate the path."

In a concurring opinion in DiFelice v. Aetna U.S. Healthcare, 346 F.3d 442 (3d Cir. 2003), Judge Edward R. Becker criticized the complexity of federal employee-benefits law under the Employee Retirement Income Security Act of 1974 (ERISA), writing:

Unfortunately, the price of all this has been descent into a Serbonian bog

Becker continued by criticizing the artificial distinctions judges were required to draw between medical treatment and insurance eligibility decisions. In an accompanying footnote, he explained the geographical and literary origins of the expression, citing Strabo, Pliny, Hume, and Milton's Paradise Lost.

Judge Richard Posner used the expression in In re Text Messaging Antitrust Litigation, 630 F.3d 622, 626 (7th Cir. 2010), while discussing the potentially enormous costs of discovery in antitrust litigation. Posner warned that an erroneous application of the pleading standard established in Bell Atlantic Corp. v. Twombly could:

immerse the parties in the discovery swamp — "that Serbonian bog ... where armies whole have sunk"
