= Diocese of Egypt =

Administrative area of the Roman/Byzantine Empire in Africa (381–539)

Diocese of Egypt Dioecesis Aegypti Διοίκησις Αἰγύπτου
- Diocese of the Byzantine Empire
- c. 381 – 539
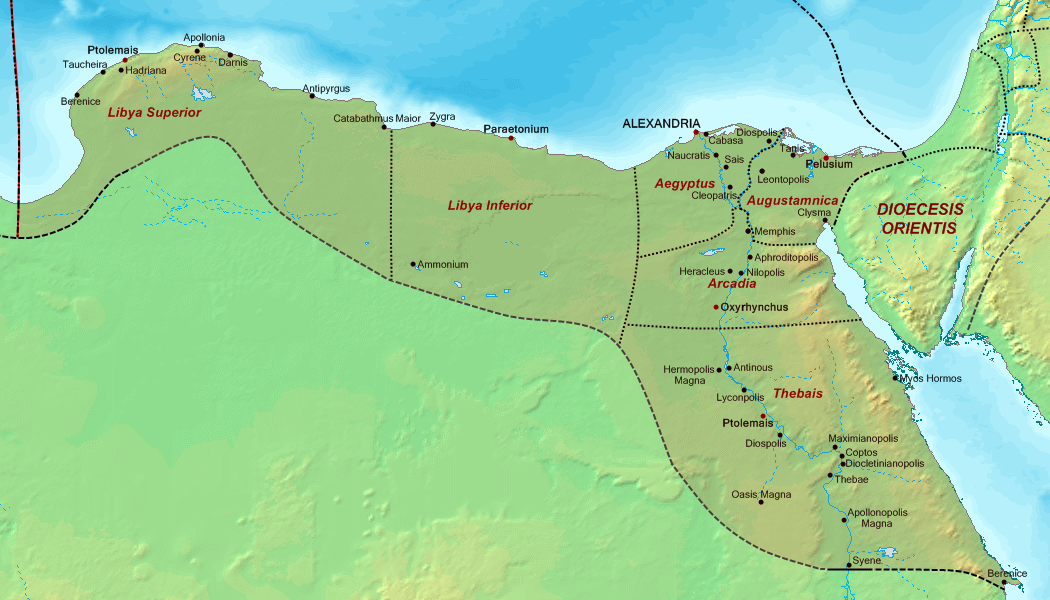
- The Diocese of Egypt c. 400.
- Capital: Alexandria
- Historical era: Late Antiquity
  - Separation from the Diocese of the East: c. 381
  - Diocese abolished by emperor Justinian I.: 539
Preceded by
Roman Egypt
- Today part of: Egypt; Libya

The Diocese of Egypt (Latin: Dioecesis Aegypti; Greek: Διοίκησις Αἰγύπτου) was a diocese of the later Roman Empire (from 395 the Eastern Roman Empire), incorporating the provinces of Egypt and Cyrenaica. Its capital was at Alexandria, and its governor had the unique title of praefectus augustalis ("Augustal Prefect", of the rank vir spectabilis; previously the governor of the imperial 'crown domain' province Egypt) instead of the ordinary vicarius. The diocese was initially part of the Diocese of the East, but in ca. 380, it became a separate entity, which lasted until its territories were overrun by the Muslim conquest of Egypt in the 640s.

== Administrative history ==
Egypt was formed into a separate diocese in about 381. According to the Notitia Dignitatum, which for the Eastern part of the Empire dates to ca. 401, the diocese came under a vicarius of the praetorian prefecture of the East, with the title of praefectus augustalis, and included six provinces:

- Aegyptus (western Nile delta), originally established in the early 4th century as Aegyptus Iovia, under a praeses
- Augustamnica (eastern Nile delta), originally established in the early 4th century as Aegyptus Herculia, under a corrector
- Arcadia (central), established ca. 397 and having previously briefly listed in the 320s as Aegyptus Mercuria, under a praeses
- Thebais (southern), under a praeses
- Libya Inferior or Libya Sicca, under a praeses
- Libya Superior or Pentapolis, under a praeses

Parallel to the civil administration, the Roman army in Egypt had been placed under a single general and military governor styled dux (dux Aegypti et Thebaidos utrarumque Libyarum) in the Tetrarchy. Shortly after the creation of Egypt as a separate diocese (between 384 and 391), the post evolved into the comes limitis Aegypti, who was directly responsible for Lower Egypt, while the subordinate dux Thebaidis was in charge of Upper Egypt (Thebais). In the middle of the 5th century, however, the latter was also promoted to the rank of comes (comes Thebaici limitis). The two officers were responsible for the limitanei (border garrison) troops stationed in the province, while until the time of Anastasius I the comitatenses field army came under the command of the magister militum per Orientem, and the palatini (guards) under the two magistri militum praesentales in Constantinople.

The comes limitis Aegypti enjoyed great power and influence in the diocese, rivalling that of the praefectus augustalis himself. From the 5th century, the comes is attested as exercising some civilian duties as well, and from 470 on, the offices of comes and praefectus augustalis were sometimes combined in a single person.

This tendency to unite civil and military authority was formalized by Justinian I in his 539 reform of Egyptian administration. The diocese was effectively abolished, and regional ducats established, where the presiding dux et augustalis was placed above the combined civil and military authority:

- dux et augustalis Aegypti, controlling Aegyptus I and Aegyptus II
- dux et augustalis Thebaidis, controlling Thebais superior and Thebais inferior
- Augustamnica I and Augustamnica II were likewise probably — the relevant portion of the edict is defective — were placed under a single dux et augustalis
- in the two Libyan provinces, the civil governors were subordinated to the respective dux
- Arcadia remained under its praeses, probably subordinated to the dux et augustalis Thebaidos, and a dux et augustalis Arcadiae does not appear until after the Persian occupation of 619–629.

== Praefecti Augustalii of the Diocese ==
For a list of Praefecti Augustalii, refer to List of governors of Roman Egypt.

== See also ==
- Greco-Roman world
- Greek and Roman Egypt

== Sources ==
- Hendy, Michael F. (1985). Studies in the Byzantine Monetary Economy c. 300–1450. Cambridge: Cambridge University Press. ISBN 0-521-24715-2.
- Palme, Bernhard (2007). "The Imperial Presence: Government and Army". In Bagnall, Roger S. (ed.). Egypt in the Byzantine World, 300–700. Cambridge University Press. pp. 244–270. ISBN 978-0521871372.
