= George of Cyprus (geographer) =

Greek Byzantine geographer

George of Cyprus (Greek: Γεώργιος Κύπρου; Latinized as Georgius Cyprius) was a Greek Byzantine geographer of the early seventh century.

Nothing is known of his life save that he was a Byzantine Greek born at Lapithos on the island of Cyprus. He is known for his Descriptio orbis Romani ("Description of the Roman world"), written in the decade 600–610. It is written in Greek, and lists cities, towns, fortresses and administrative divisions of the Eastern Roman Empire. The list begins with Italy and moves counterclockwise along the Mediterranean, from Africa, Egypt and Oriens. The surviving list is evidently incomplete, as the Balkans are excluded. The Descriptio only survived in a compilation, probably from the 9th century, along with other lists such as ecclesiastical notitiae. It is possible that the compiler, usually thought to be the Armenian Basil of Ialimbana, altered George's text.

== Publications ==
- Georgii Cyprii Descriptio Orbis Romani (Lipsiae, 1890), editor Heinrich Gelzer

== See also ==
- Synecdemus
