= Pelusium =

Pelusium Ⲡⲉⲣⲉⲙⲟⲩⲛ Ⲥⲓⲛ الفرما
- Ancient city
- Location in Egypt
- Coordinates: 31°02′30″N 32°32′42″E
- Country: Egypt
- Time zone: UTC+2 (EST)

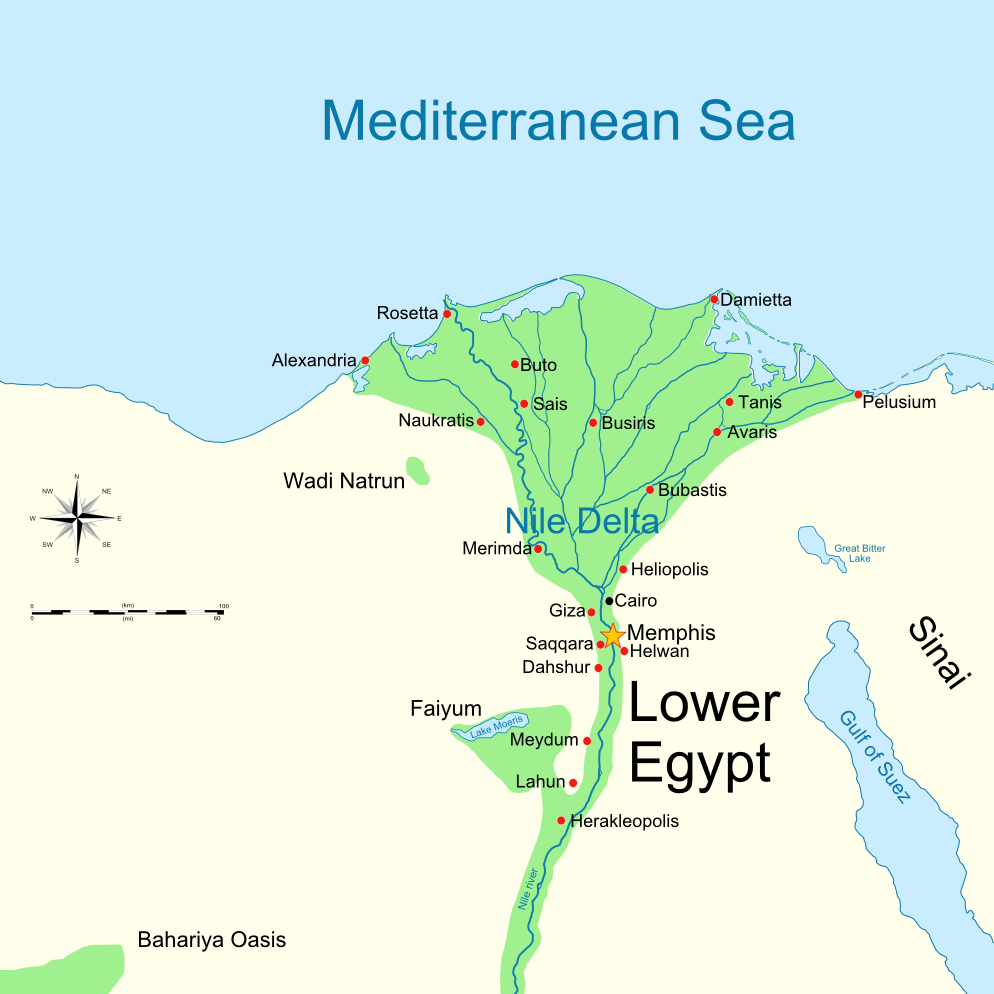
Map of ancient Lower Egypt showing Pelusium

Pelusium (Ancient Egyptian: pr-jmn; Coptic: Ⲡⲉⲣⲉⲙⲟⲩⲛ/Ⲡⲉⲣⲉⲙⲟⲩⲏ, romanized: Peremoun, or Ⲥⲓⲛ, romanized: Sin; Hebrew: סִין, romanized: sin; Koine Greek: Πηλούσιον, romanized: Pēlousion; Latin: Pēlūsium; Egyptian Arabic: تل الفرما, romanized: Tell el-Farama) was an important city in the eastern extremes of Egypt's Nile Delta, 30 km (19 mi) to the southeast of the modern Port Said. It became a Roman provincial capital and Metropolitan archbishopric and remained a multiple Catholic titular see and an Eastern Orthodox active archdiocese.

== Location ==
Pelusium lay between the seaboard and the marshes of the Nile Delta, about two-and-a-half miles from the sea. The port was choked by sand as early as the first century BC, and the coastline has now advanced far beyond its ancient limits that the city, even in the third century AD, was at least four miles from the Mediterranean.

The principal product of the neighbouring lands was flax, and the linum Pelusiacum (Pliny's Natural History xix. 1. s. 3) was both abundant and of a very fine quality. Pelusium was also known for being an early producer of beer, known as the Pelusian drink. Pelusium stood as a border-fortress, a place of great strength, on the frontier, protecting Egypt as regards to Syria and the sea. Thus, from its position, it was directly exposed to attack by any invaders of Egypt; it was often besieged, and several important battles were fought around its walls.

== Names and identity ==
s nw or z nw Z1
sn
in hieroglyphs
Era: Old Kingdom
(2686–2181 BC)

s M42 nw t niwt or z wn xAst
swnj or swn
in hieroglyphs
Era: Late Period
(664–332 BC)

Pelusium was the easternmost major city of Lower Egypt, situated upon the easternmost bank of the Nile, the Ostium Pelusiacum, to which it gave its name. Pliny the Elder gives its location in relation to the frontier of Arabia: "At Ras Straki, 65 miles from Pelusium, is the frontier of Arabia. Then begins Idumaea, and Palestine at the point where the Serbonian Lake comes into view. This lake... is now an inconsiderable fen."

The Roman name "Pelusium" was derived from the Koine Greek name, and the Greek from a translation of the Egyptian one. It was variously known as Sena and Per-Amun (Late Egyptian and Coptic: Ⲡⲉⲣⲉⲙⲟⲩⲛ Peremoun) "House or Temple of the sun god Amun", Pelousion or Saien (Koine Greek: Πηλούσιον or Σαῖν), Imperial Aramaic and Hebrew: סִין, romanized: Sin, and Egyptian Arabic Tell el-Farama). According to William Smith, it was the Sin of the Hebrew Bible in Ezekiel 30:15. Smith surmised that the word in its Egyptian and Greek forms (Peremoun or Peromi; Πήλος Pelos) had the connotation of a 'city made of mud' (omi, Coptic, "mud").

The anonymous author of the Aramaic Palestinian Targum, as well as Jonathan ben Uzziel in his tranlation, translated the word "Rameses" in the Pentateuch as meaning Pelusin (Pelusium). It is not certain whether or not the 10th-century rabbi and scholar Saadia Gaon agreed with that determination, although he possessed another tradition of later making, writing that Rameses mentioned in Numbers 33:3, and in Exodus 1:11 and 12:37, as also in Genesis 47:11, refers to Ain Shams. Modern-day historical geographers associate ʻAin Shams with Heliopolis.

According to the 1st-century historian Josephus, Pelusium was situated on one of the mouths of the Nile.

== History ==
The following are the most notable events in the history of Pelusium:

- Sennacherib, the Neo-Assyrian emperor, 720-715 BC, in the reign of Sethos the Aethiopian of the 25th Dynasty of Egypt, advanced from the Kingdom of Judah upon Pelusium, but retired without fighting from before its walls in Isaiah 31:8; Herodotus ii. 141; Strabo xiii. p. 604. His retreat was ascribed to the favor of Hephaestos towards Sethos, his priest. In the night, while the Assyrians slept, a host of field mice gnawed their bow-strings and shield-straps, who fled, and many of them were slain in their flight by the Egyptians. Herodotus saw in the temple of Hephaestos at Memphis, a record of this victory of the Egyptians: a statue of Sethos holding a mouse in his hand. The story probably rests on the fact that in the symbolism of Egypt, the mouse implied destruction. (Compare Horapolis Hieroglyph. i. 50; Claudius Aelianus, De Natura Animalium vi. 41.)
- The decisive Battle of Pelusium (525 BC) which transferred the throne of the Pharaohs to Cambyses II, king of the Persians, was fought near Pelusium. The fields around were strewn with the bones of the combatants when Herodotus visited. He noted that the skulls of the Egyptians were distinguishable from those of the Persians by their superior hardness, a fact confirmed he said by the mummies. He ascribed this to the Egyptians' shaving their heads from infancy, and to the Persians covering them up with folds of cloth or linen. (Herodotus ii. 10, seq.); however, according to legend, Pelusium fell without a fight, by the simple expedient of having the invading army drive cats (sacred to the local goddess Bast) before them. As Cambyses advanced at once to Memphis, Pelusium probably surrendered itself immediately after the battle. (Polyaen. Stratag. vii. 9.)
- In 373 BC, Pharnabazus, satrap of Phrygia, and Iphicrates, the commander of the Athenian armament, appeared before Pelusium, but retired without attacking it, Nectanebo I, king of Egypt, having added to its former defences by laying the neighboring lands under water, and blocking up the navigable channels of the Nile by embankments. (Diodorus Siculus xv. 42; Cornelius Nepos, Iphicrates c. 5.)
- Pelusium was attacked and taken by the Persians, c. 340 BC. The city contained at the time a garrison of 5,000 Greek mercenaries under the command of Philophron. At first, owing to the rashness of the Thebans in the Persian service, the defenders had the advantage. But the Egyptian king Nectanebo II hastily venturing on a pitched battle, his troops were cut to pieces, and Pelusium surrendered to the Theban general Lacrates on honorable conditions. (Diodorus Siculus xvi. 43.)
- In 333 BC, Pelusium opened its gates to Alexander the Great, who placed a garrison in it under the command of one of those officers entitled Companions of the King. (Arrian, Exp. Alex. iii. 1, seq.; Quintus Curtius iv. 33.)
- In 173 BC, Antiochus Epiphanes utterly defeated the troops of Ptolemy Philometor under the walls of Pelusium, which he took and retained after he had retired from the rest of Egypt. (Polybius Legat. § 82; Hieronym. in Daniel. xi.) On the fall of the Syrian kingdom, however, if not earlier, Pelusium had been restored to the Ptolemies.
- In 55 BC, again belonging to Egypt, Mark Antony, as cavalry commander to the Roman proconsul Gabinius, defeated the Egyptian army, and made himself master of the city. Ptolemy Auletes, in whose behalf the Romans invaded Egypt at this time, wished to put the Pelusians to the sword; but his intention was thwarted by Mark Anthony. (Plut. Anton. c. 3; Valerius Max. ix. 1.)
- In 48 BC, Pompey was murdered near Pelusium.
- In 47 BC, Mithridates of Pergamon stormed and took Pelusium on his way to reinforce Caesar who was being besieged in Alexandria.
- In 30 BC, more than half a year after his victory at Actium, Augustus appeared before Pelusium, and was admitted by its governor Seleucus within its walls.
- In 115–117 AD, during the Diaspora Revolt, the Jews are said to have taken control of the waterways near Pelusium. This is documented by the Greek historian Appian, who was an eyewitness and escaped from Jewish naval forces at Pelusium.
- In 501 AD, Pelusium suffered greatly from the Persian invasion of Egypt (Eutychius, Annal.).
- In 541 AD, the Plague of Justinian first emerged in Pelusium before spreading across the Byzantine Empire.
- In 639, Pelusium offered a protracted, though, in the end, an ineffectual resistance to the arms of Amr ibn al-As. As on former occasions, the surrender of the key of the Delta was nearly equivalent to the subjugation of Egypt itself.
- In 749, Pelusium was raided by the Bashmuric Copts.
- In c. 870, Pelusium is mentioned as a major port in the trade network of the Radhanite merchants.
- In 1118, Baldwin I of Jerusalem razed the city to the ground, but died shortly afterwards of food poisoning after eating a plateful of the local fish.

The sultans who ruled Pelusium following the Crusades, however, generally neglected the harbors, and from that period Pelusium, which had long been on the decline, almost disappeared from history.

== Archaeological research ==
The first excavations in Pelusium started in 1910 and were conducted by French Egyptologist Jean Cledat, who also drew the plan of the whole site. In the 1980s, work was carried out by Egyptian researchers directed by Mohammed Abd El-Maksoud as well as French linguist and historian Jean-Yves Carrez-Maratray. The Egyptian expedition uncovered Roman baths with mosaics, dated to the 3rd century. Due to the planned construction of the Peace Canal, which was to cross the site, salvage excavations were commenced in 1991. Each of the several institutions from all over the world which took part in the project was assigned its sector in the area of Pelusium and its vicinity, i.e., the so-called Greater Pelusium. The Egyptian team explored the Roman theatre and the Byzantine basilica; the Swiss carried out a survey; the British worked in the southern part of the site, and the Canadian in the western. From 2003 to 2009, an expedition from the Polish Centre of Mediterranean Archaeology University of Warsaw conducted research in the so-called Great Theater from the 2nd/3rd century and residential buildings of a later date. The Polish-Egyptian team also carried out restoration and reconstruction works in the theater.

In 2019, besides the main streets of Pelusium city, a 2,500-square-metre Graeco-Roman building made of red brick and limestone was revealed by the Egyptian archeological mission. Interior design of the building contained the remnants of three 60 cm-thick circular benches. According to archaeologist Mostafa Waziri, the building was very likely used to hold meetings for the citizens′ representatives or headquarters for the Senate Council of Pelusium.

In 2022 archaeologists found the remains of a temple of Zeus-Kasios. Researchers knew about the temple, since in early 1900 Jean Cledat had found Greek inscriptions that showed the existence of the temple, but this was the first time that ruins of the temple were found.

== Roman military roads ==
Of the six military roads formed or adopted by the Romans in Egypt, the following are mentioned in the Itinerarium of Antoninus as connected with Pelusium:

- From Memphis to Pelusium. This road joined the great road from Pselcis in Nubia at Babylon, nearly opposite Memphis, and coincided with it as far as Scenae Veteranorum. The two roads, viz. that from Pselcis to Scenae Veteranorum, which turned off to the east at Heliopolis, and that from Memphis to Pelusium, connected the latter city with the capital of Lower Egypt, Trajan's canal, and Arsinoe, near Suez, on the Sinus Heroopolites (modern Gulf of Suez).
- From Acca to Alexandria, ran along the Mediterranean Sea from Raphia to Pelusium.

== Ecclesiastical history ==
Pelusium is named (as "Sin, the strength of Egypt") in the Bible, in Ezekiel 30:15. According to Coptic tradition, the Holy Family passed through Pelusium during their flight to Egypt.

Pelusium became the seat of a Christian bishop at an early stage. Its bishop Dorotheus took part in the First Council of Nicaea in 325. In 335, Marcus was exiled because of his support for Athanasius of Alexandria. His replacement Pancratius, an exponent of Arianism, was at the Second Council of Sirmium in 351. Several of the succeeding known bishops of Pelusium were also considered heretical by the orthodox. As the capital of the Roman province of Augustamnica Prima, Pelusium was ecclesiastically the metropolitan see of the province.

Pelusium is still the seat of a metropolitan bishopric of the modern-day Eastern Orthodox Church.

Isidore of Pelusium (d. c.450), who was born in Alexandria, became an ascetic and settled on a mountain near Pelusium, in the tradition of the Desert Fathers.

Pelusium is today listed by the Catholic Church as a Metropolitan titular archbishopric both in the Latin Church and the Eastern Catholic Melkite Catholic Church.

=== Latin titular see ===
In the nineteenth century, the diocese was nominally restored as a Metropolitan titular archbishopric Pelusium of the Romans.

It is vacant since decades, having had the following incumbents, of the highest rank with a single episcopal (lowest rank) exception:

- Joseph Sadoc Alemany y Conill, Dominican Order (O.P.) (1885.03.20 – 1888.04.14)
- Guido Corbelli, Order of Observant Friars Minor (O.F.M. Obs.) (1888.03.08 – 1896.06.22)
- Giovanni Nepomuceno Glavina (1896.12.03 – 1899.11)
- Alphonse-Martin Larue (1899.12.14 – 1903.05.01)
- Theodor Kohn (1904.06.10 – 1915.12.03)
- Titular Bishop John Francis Regis Canevin (1921.01.09 – 1927.03.22)
- Plácido Ángel Rey de Lemos, Friars Minor (O.F.M.) (1927.07.30 – 1941.02.12)
- José Ignacio López Umaña (1942.03.15 – 1943.11.13)
- Patrick Mary O'Donnell (1948.11.08 – 1965.04.10)

=== Melkite titular see ===
Since its twentieth century establishment as Metropolitan titular archbishopric, Pelusium of the (Greek) Melkites has had the following incumbents, all of this highest rank :

- Pierre Kamel Medawar, Society of Missionaries of Saint Paul (M.S.P.) (1943.03.13 – 1985.04.27)
- Isidore Battikha, Basilian Aleppian Order (B.A.) (992.08.25 – 2006.02.09)
- Georges Bakar (2006.02.09 – ...), Protosyncellus of Egypt, Sudan and South Sudan of the Greek-Melkites (Egypt)

== See also ==
- List of ancient Egyptian towns and cities

== Bibliography ==
- Benovitz, Nancy (2014). "The Justinianic plague: evidence from the dated Greek epitaphs of Byzantine Palestine and Arabia". Journal of Roman Archaeology. 27: 487–498. doi:10.1017/S1047759414001378. ISSN 1047-7594.
- Horbury, William (2014). Jewish War under Trajan and Hadrian. Cambridge University Press. ISBN 978-1-139-04905-4.
- Pucci Ben Zeev, Miriam (2006). "The Uprisings in the Jewish Diaspora, 116–117". In Katz, Steven T. (ed.). The Late Roman-Rabbinic Period. The Cambridge History of Judaism. Vol. 4. Cambridge: Cambridge University Press. pp. 93–104. doi:10.1017/CHOL9780521772488.005. ISBN 978-0-521-77248-8.

== Sources and external links ==
- "Pelusium: Gateway to Egypt". archaeology.org.
- Herbermann, Charles, ed. (1913). "Pelusium" . Catholic Encyclopedia. New York: Robert Appleton Company.
- GCatholic - Latin titular see with incumbent bio links
- GCatholic - Melkite titular see with incumbent bio links
