= Al-Rawda, North Sinai =

Village in North Sinai, Egypt

Qaryat ar Rawḑah قرية الروضة Al-Rawda
- Village
- Location within Egypt
- Coordinates: 31°02′25″N 33°21′04″E
- Country: Egypt
- Governorate: North Sinai
- Municipal Division: Bir al-Abd
- Time zone: UTC+2 (EET)
  - Summer (DST): UTC+3 (EEST)

Al-Rawda (Arabic: الروضة) is a village in the markaz of Bir al-Abed, in the North Sinai Governorate of Egypt. It is a center of the Jaririya Sufi order, with the majority of the population following it (though that might have changed with recent migration), and of the Sawarka tribe. The Al-Rawda mosque and its zawiya was established in the winter of 1953–1954 by Eid Abu Jarir, and it was expanded and a minaret added in about 1990.

In 2016, it had a population of 2,111, according to the Central Agency for Public Mobilization and Statistics. However, the village has been heavily affected by the Sinai insurgency, first taking in displaced persons fleeing Sheikh Zuweid and Rafah, and then losing 22% of its male population in the 2017 Sinai mosque attack.

The major local industries are a salt factory processing materials from nearby coastal salt works in Zaranik Protectorate on a sabkha of Lake Bardawil, and also agriculture.
