= Sinai attacks =

Sinai attacks may refer to these attacks in the Sinai Peninsula of Egypt during the Sinai insurgency:

- August 2012 Sinai attack
- October 2014 Sinai attacks
- January 2015 Sinai attacks
- July 2015 Sinai clashes
- October 2016 Sinai attacks
- 2017 Sinai mosque attack

== See also ==
- Sinai (disambiguation)
