= Kadesh =

Qadesh, Qedesh, Qetesh, Kadesh, Kedesh, Kadeš and Qades come from the common Semitic root "Q-D-Š", which means "sacred."

Kadesh and variations may refer to:

== Ancient/biblical places ==
- Kadesh (Syria) or Qadesh, an ancient city of the Levant, on or near the headwaters or a ford of the Orontes River
  - Tell al-Nabi Mando, also called Qadesh and adjacent to the ancient site
  - Battle of Kadesh or Battle of Qadesh, a battle between the forces of the Egyptian Empire under Ramesses II and the Hittite Empire under Muwatalli II
- Kadesh (biblical) or Qadesh, biblical site or sites, one of which is sometimes named as Kadesh Barnea
- Kedesh, also Kedesh Naphthali, an ancient city in Upper Galilee, Israel

== Modern places ==
- Kadesh Barnea, also known as Nitzanei Sinai, a modern community settlement in the Negev desert of Israel
- Qadas, a Palestinian Arab Shiite village northeast of Safad that was depopulated during the 1948 Arab-Israeli war
- Kidosht or Kadāsh, a village in Momenabad Rural District, in the Central District of Sarbisheh County, South Khorasan Province, Iran
- Qades, a village in Badghis Province in north western Afghanistan

== Other uses ==
- Qetesh, a Canaanite and Egyptian fertility goddess
- Qetesh (Stargate), a character in the Stargate fictional universe
- Kadosh, a 1999 film by Amos Gitai
- Qadesh, the male equivalent of Qedesha, a sacred or temple prostitute
- Qadesh, a military unit in the Syrian Civil War that fights under the command of the Republican Guard.

== See also ==
- Kaddish (disambiguation)
