= January 2015 Sinai attacks =

Battle in Egypt

January 2015 Sinai Attacks
- Part of Sinai insurgency
| Date | 29 January 2015 |
| Location | North Sinai |
| Result | Initial ISIS victory: Egyptian authorities bomb ISIS installations |

Belligerents
| Egypt: Egyptian Army | Islamic State of Iraq and the Levant: Wilayat Sinai (formerly known as Ansar Bait al-Maqdis) |

Casualties and losses
| 44 killed (24 soldiers, 6 policemen, 14 civilians) 62+ | Unknown in subsequent operations: 47 killed |

Location on the Sinai Peninsula of the three cities attacked in January 2015 by Wilayat Sinai.

On 29 January 2015, militants from the ISIL-affiliated Wilayat Sinai (Sinai Province) militant group launched a series of attacks on army and police bases in Arish using car bombs and mortars. The attacks, which occurred in more than six different locations, resulted in 44 deaths.

== Attacks ==
Militants launched simultaneous assaults involving mortars and car bombs on security facilities in the North Sinai towns of El-Arish, Sheikh Zuweid and Rafah, targeting the army's Battalion 101 following the North Sinai curfew hours that began after 7 pm and ended at 6 am. In Al-Arish, police offices and an army base were the first targets hit, followed by a military-owned hotel which sustained heavy rocket attacks, then came the car bomb explosion at the rear gate of the army base. A number of security checkpoints were also hit later in the day, including one south of the city and one in Rafah. The Sheikh Zuweid attack involved the Al-Zohor military camp, which was hit by mortar shells. Residents of the Sinai and the Egyptian state news media reported that the attackers had used multiple car bombs and mortars against their targets.

=== Security response ===
Egyptian warplanes bombed militant targets in the region where the attacks took place. The following day Apache helicopters also launched air raids on alleged militant spots. It was also reported that on 6 February 2015 Egyptian security forces launched an attack, killing 47 Islamic militants in Northern Sinai.

== Casualties ==
44 people were killed overall. Wilayat Sinai, however, released a statement where it said that "hundreds" were killed, a claim that was rejected by the military which said that the numbers will not be announced. Estimates of the wounded range from 62 to over a hundred.

Most of the casualties were a result of the first attacks on the hotel and military base, during which 25 people were killed, including nine civilians, and more than 58 were wounded.

== Damage ==
Parts of the Al-Arish National Museum, which holds numerous artifacts and paintings from ancient times, were destroyed during the bombings, including the main front and one of the sides of the building which later collapsed as a result. However, the head of the Museums Sector at the Ministry of State of Antiquities, Ahmad Sharaf, confirmed that none of the museum's antiques were harmed during the incident.

Government newspaper Al-Ahram said that one of its offices, which is opposite to the hotel and base that were hit, was completely destroyed during the attacks. It is unclear, however, whether the office was a target of the assault or not.

== Responsibility ==
The Islamic State of Iraq and the Levant linked militant group Wilayat Sinai, formerly known as Ansar Bait al-Maqdis until it pledged allegiance to ISIL in November 2014, claimed responsibility for the attacks on an affiliated Twitter account. Wilayat Sinai said that the incidents were part of a series of attacks that they had dubbed "We Swear We Will Revenge", which the group dedicated to "avenge for women and girls" held in government prisons.

== Reactions ==
Domestic

In response to the attacks, President Abdel Fattah el-Sisi, who was attending the African Union summit in Ethiopia at the time, cut short his visit and returned to Egypt. Sisi ordered the establishment of a "unified command to combat terrorism" in the Sinai Peninsula and put Osama Askar, commander of the Third Field Army, in charge of the command after promoting him to lieutenant-general. Sisi's decree was announced by the Supreme Council of the Armed Forces (SCAF). During a meeting between Sisi and the SCAF, plans have been discussed to combat the "qualitative development of terrorist operations in Sinai," despite "the success of daily strong blows to terrorist hotbeds". After the meeting, Sisi made a live address to the nation, where he said: "I am ready to die [for Egypt]... and meet God for what I have done". He also hinted back at the period before the 2013 protests and ouster of Egyptian president Mohamed Morsi, claiming he had spoken with a leader of the Muslim Brotherhood who allegedly told him that people would come "from all around the world" to fight him.

International

The African Union, Organisation of Islamic Cooperation, United Nations Secretary-General Ban Ki-moon and the Security Council condemned the attacks, along with the governments of Bahrain, China, Cyprus, Hungary, Indonesia, Iran, Italy, Jordan, Kuwait, Lebanon, Morocco, the Palestinian Authority, Russia, Saudi Arabia, Singapore, Syria, Tunisia, the United Arab Emirates, the United Kingdom and the United States.

Furthermore, Hassan Firouzabadi, top commander of the Armed Forces of the Islamic Republic of Iran, said that the attackers were "helping the Zionist occupiers". "The Islamic forces are deployed in Sinai desert to prevent the Zionists’ aggression on Muslim territories, including the strategic Sinai Peninsula, and attacking them is a foolish act.", Firouzabadi said.

== See also ==
- October 2014 Sinai attacks
- July 2015 Sinai attacks
- Sinai insurgency
- List of terrorist incidents, 2015
