= Battles of Iqtiya, Qatiya, Genayen, and Merih =

2020 Egyptian battle against ISSP forces

- Part of Sinai insurgency
Date	21 July 2020 – 12 October 2020
Location	Rabaa, Iqtiya, Qatiya, Genayen, and Merih, Bir el-Abd, Sinai Peninsula, Egypt
Result	Egyptian victory: Egyptian forces repel ISSP at Rabaa in July, and recapture the villages from ISSP in October
Territorial changes	Islamic State captures Iqtiya, Qaitiya, Merih, and Genayen until October

Belligerents
Egypt	Islamic State - Sinai Province

Casualties and losses
2+ killed, 18+ injured (Rabaa only, per Egypt); 40 killed, 60 injured (Rabaa only, per ISSP)	18+ killed (Rabaa only, per Egypt)
- 14+ civilians killed, several injured

On July 21, 2020, jihadists from Islamic State – Sinai Province (ISSP) attacked an Egyptian military camp in the village of Rabaa, on the outskirts of Bir al-Abd, Sinai Peninsula. The attack was in preparation for a larger assault on an Egyptian security complex in the town, but Egyptian forces repelled the attack. ISSP militants then fled and captured four towns near Bir el-Abd, which they occupied until October. Booby-trapped buildings in the towns then killed fourteen civilians. The attack was the most significant attack by ISSP against Egyptian forces in several years.

== Background ==
The town of Bir el-Abd became a target for the Islamic State's Sinai Province in 2018 following a heavy focus on the city of Arish by Egyptian forces after an attack on a mosque in Arish by ISSP killed over three hundred worshippers. ISSP intensified its campaign in and around the city, with pamphlets naming government sympathizers that would be beheaded, attacks on Dawarga tribesmen, and kidnapping villagers in areas controlled by the Union of Sinai Tribes, a pro-Egyptian tribal militia.

== Attack ==
The attack began with two car bombers at an Egyptian military camp in Rabaa, on the outskirts of Bir el-Abd, by ISSP. Dozens of ISSP militants then attacked the Egyptian camp on foot. The Egyptian military released a statement accusing the jihadists of planning to launch an attack on Egyptian security complexes in the town of Bir el-Abd, and that a shootout with the militants left two soldiers killed and four injured, as well as eighteen jihadists dead. ISSP released a statement claiming that the attack had killed forty Egyptian soldiers, and injured sixty others. The militants fled west, and occupied four villages of Qatiya, Iqtiya, Ganayen, and Merih.

ISSP militants, once reaching the villages, set up roadblocks and planted the flags of the Islamic State in the villages. Villagers in the occupied towns attempted to flee the Islamic State in the wake of the attack, and locals affiliated with the Egyptian army were executed by the group. Over the following days, several Egyptian military officers were abducted and executed in and around the villages. Egyptian forces surrounded the villages, and captured all four in October 2020 after a slow siege that began in August. Little is known about what occurred in the villages between August and October due to the Egyptian government banning media from reporting in the Sinai Peninsula.

== Aftermath ==
Following the Egyptian Army's recapture of all four villages, residents stated that they still felt unsafe and that the army's negligence in removing mines posed a danger to returning residents. ISSP had booby-trapped many areas in the villages, and some residents stated that ISSP still had a presence there despite Egyptian forces nearby. On October 10, two women returning home were killed by a mine in Qatiya, and four people were killed and one injured in a mine explosion in their home in Iqtiya in October 12. Two people were killed each in Genayen and Merih, and one was injured in Genayan. On October 24, five people were killed in a mine explosion in Iqtiya.

The Islamic State pushed westward after they were kicked out of the four villages, and began another campaign of assassinations against Egyptian officials. These attacks mainly targeted the Air Defense Forces of the Egyptian Army, with one attack killing ADF Major Mahmoud Reda.
