= Kadish =

Kadish is a surname. Notable people with the surname include:

- Alan Kadish (born 1956), American cardiologist, academic administrator
- Ben-Ami Kadish (1923–2012), U.S. Army mechanical engineer and agent for Israel
- George Kadish (1910–1997), Lithuanian photographer
- Karl Kadish (born 1945), American chemist
- Kevin Kadish (born 1971), American songwriter
- Mark J. Kadish, American judge
- Mike Kadish (born 1950), American football player
- Reuben Kadish (1913–1992), American artist
- Ronald T. Kadish (born 1948), U.S. Air Force general
- Sanford Kadish (1921–2014), American criminal law scholar
- Sharman Kadish (born 1959), British Jewish historian

== See also ==
- Kaddish (disambiguation)
