= October 2016 Sinai attacks =

Terrorist attack during 2016

- Part of the Sinai insurgency
- Bir al-Abd (Egypt)
- Location: Bir al-Abed, North Sinai, Egypt
- Date: 14 October 2016
- Target: Soldiers of the Egyptian Armed Forces
- Attack type: Bomb attack, shooting
- Weapons: Mortar rounds, rockets and assault rifles
- Deaths: 12
- Injuries: 8
- Perpetrators: Islamic State of Iraq and the Levant: Wilayat Sinai (formerly known as Ansar Bait al-Maqdis)

The October 2016 Sinai attacks was a terrorist attack on an Egyptian army checkpoint in the city of Bir al-Abed, Egypt (located 40 kilometers west of Al-Arish), on 14 October 2016. A group of militants armed with assault rifles and heavier weapons attacked an Egyptian army checkpoint while mortar rounds and rockets were fired directed to a military checkpoint. In response, the Egyptian military forces killed around 15 militants following the attack. The Islamic State's Wilayat Sinai branch claimed responsibility in a statement released later the same day.

According to Al Jazeera, Bir al-Abed had been largely spared the violence that had rocked northern Sinai by insurgents following the ouster of Morsi 3 years ago. The attack came weeks after Egypt marks its first anniversary of the Metrojet Flight 9268 crash over the Sinai Peninsula on October 31, 2015.

== Attack ==
The attack began early in the morning when militants approached and attacked a military checkpoint. The attack resulted the deaths of 12 Egyptian army personnel and wounded six others.

The Egyptian army spokesman said in a statement that soldiers clashed with the assailants in the northern Sinai. A police official and medic told Agence France-Presse that mortar rounds and rockets were fired towards the army post by militants. The Egyptian army eliminated at least 15 suspected militants in response to the attack.

== Responsibility ==
The Islamic State's Wilayat Sinai branch quickly claimed responsibility for the attack in a statement posted on social messaging app, Telegram. The statement said that its "soldiers" were "safe and sound" and had seized arms and ammunition's from the Egyptian Army during the attack on the military checkpoint.

== Reactions ==
=== Domestic ===
Following the attack, President of Egypt Abdel Fattah el-Sisi offered his condolences and sympathy to the families of the 12 Egyptian soldiers who were killed, referring to them as "heroes."

- Egypt's cabinet, Parliament and Al-Azhar strongly condemned the attack, in statements reported by the MENA state news agency.
- Egyptian Prime Minister Sherif Ismail added that "the state is determined to cleanse Egypt from these evil elements."
- Egyptian Parliament Speaker Ali Abdel Aal said that these recent attacks "which aim to target the state and terrorize the society, will not succeed".

=== International ===
- Bahrain: Bahrain's Ministry of Foreign Affairs expressed its sincere condolences and sympathy to the families of the victims and wished speedy recovery to those injured in this terrorist act, which has nothing to do with religion and which contravened all human and moral principles. The ministry also said that Bahrain was commuted to fight terrorism in all its forms and manifestations and renewed its call for concerted international efforts to eradicate terrorism, which threatened all countries, and to dry up its sources of funding.
- European Union: A statement by the spokesperson for EU High Representative Federica Mogherini in a statement that "it is a tragic reminder of the continuing terrorist threat to Egypt that threatens its stability. The European Union stands by the Egyptian people and government in their fight against the Islamic State, an important part of the broader fight against ISIL in the region," it added.
- France: In a press release, the spokesman of the French Foreign Ministry Roman Nadal expressed his country’s condolences to the families of the victims, renewing solidarity with the Egyptian government and people in fighting terrorism.
- Hungary: The Hungarian government has underlined its full support and solidarity with efforts exerted by the Egyptian government, the army and security bodies in the war against terrorism, according to a statement released by the Hungarian embassy in Cairo.
- Lebanon: Lebanese Prime Minister and acting President Tammam Salam offered his condolences Sunday to Egyptian President Abdel Fattah al-Sisi following the attack.
  - Former Lebanese Prime Minister Saad Hariri has expressed solidarity with Egypt following the attack and denounced the attacks as a "despicable terrorist attack and all the assaults that target the Egyptian Army."
- Iran: On 16 October, Iran Foreign Ministry spokesman Bahram Qassemi expressed Iran’s disgust with all terrorist acts in any form and location, calling on the international community and regional governments to take heed of the expansion of the "ominous phenomenon." Mr. Qassemi has also said that Iran voiced empathy with the Egyptian government and nation, offering condolences to the families of the victims.
- Saudi Arabia: A statement released by the Saudi Foreign Ministry extended condolences to the families of the Egyptian martyrs and the government, wishing the injured a speedy recovery.
- Turkey: The Turkish Foreign Ministry has condemned the attacks. "We strongly condemn the terrorist attack which was perpetrated near Bir al-Abd. We extend our condolences to the brotherly Egyptian people, convey our sympathies to their families, and wish a speedy recovery to the wounded," said in a statement by the Turkish Foreign Ministry.
- United Arab Emirates: In a statement issued on Friday, the Ministry of Foreign Affairs and International Cooperation expressed its deepest condemnation of these criminal attacks and its constant rejection of all forms and manifestations of terrorism. It also said that the United Arab Emirates supports Egypt's fight against terrorism and stressed that such cowardly acts will not undermine the determinations of Egyptian people to fight tirelessly against terrorism that has no religion, home and morals.
- United Kingdom: The British ambassador to Egypt, John Casson extended deep condolences to families of the deceased Egyptian soldiers. On his Twitter account, Mr. Casson also confirmed Britain's strong and unwavering support for Egypt against terrorism.
- Yemen: The Yemeni Foreign Ministry released a statement condemning the terror attack. In a statement, the ministry said "such crimes have nothing to do with Islam" or any other religion and all human values. The statement affirmed Yemen's full support for Egypt and the measures taken to fight against violence and extremism. The ministry called on the international community to shoulder its responsibility in uprooting terrorism worldwide.

== See also ==
- 2017 Sinai attack
- Sinai insurgency
- Operation Martyr's Right
- 2015 Arish attack
