= Persecution of Sufis =

Persecution of Sufis over the course of centuries has included acts of religious discrimination, persecution, and violence both by Sunni and Shia Muslims, such as destruction of Sufi shrines, tombs and mosques, suppression of Sufi orders, murder, and terrorism against adherents of Sufism in a number of Muslim-majority countries. The Republic of Turkey banned all Sufi orders and abolished their institutions in 1925, after Sufis opposed the new secular order. The Islamic Republic of Iran has harassed Sufis, reportedly for their lack of support for the government doctrine of "governance of the jurist" (i. e., that the supreme Shiite jurist should be the nation's political leader).

In most other Muslim-majority countries, attacks on Sufis and especially their shrines have come from adherents of puritanical and revivalist schools of Islamic thought (Deobandi, Salafi movement, Wahhabism, and Islamic Modernism), who believe that practices such as visitation to and veneration of the tombs of Sufi saints, celebration of the birthdays of Sufi saints, and dhikr ("remembrance" of God) ceremonies are bid‘ah (impure "innovation") and shirk ("polytheistic").

== History ==
Examples of people presumably executed for their Sufi views and practices include: Abbasid mystic Mansur Al-Hallaj in 922, Ayn al-Quzat Hamadani in 1131, Ishraqi philosopher Shahab al-Din Suhrawardi in 1191, Ottoman mystic and mutineer Sheikh Bedreddin in 1420, and the wandering dervish Sarmad Kashani in 1661 in Mughal India. The exact reasons for executions in some of those cases were disputed.

Suppression of Sufism in the Islamic world has a long history and it has been motivated by both religious purposes and in later centuries, also political purposes. Though some Muslims see Sufism as a pious and pure expression of faith, its doctrines and practices have been rejected by others.

Revivalist Ibn Taymiyya (1263–1328) wrote about what he called the metaphysical "deviations" of Sufism, and criticism of Sufism is attested in the writings of Ibn Jawzi. Subsequent Muslim theologians influenced by Ibn Taymiyya's doctrines such as Muhammad ibn Ali al-Shawkani, Ibn 'Abd al-Wahhab etc. would arise to attack the mystical beliefs and practices of various Sufi Tariqahs. In the 19th century, these ideas became popular and several Islamic reformers began condemning Sufi practices as contrary to Tawhid.

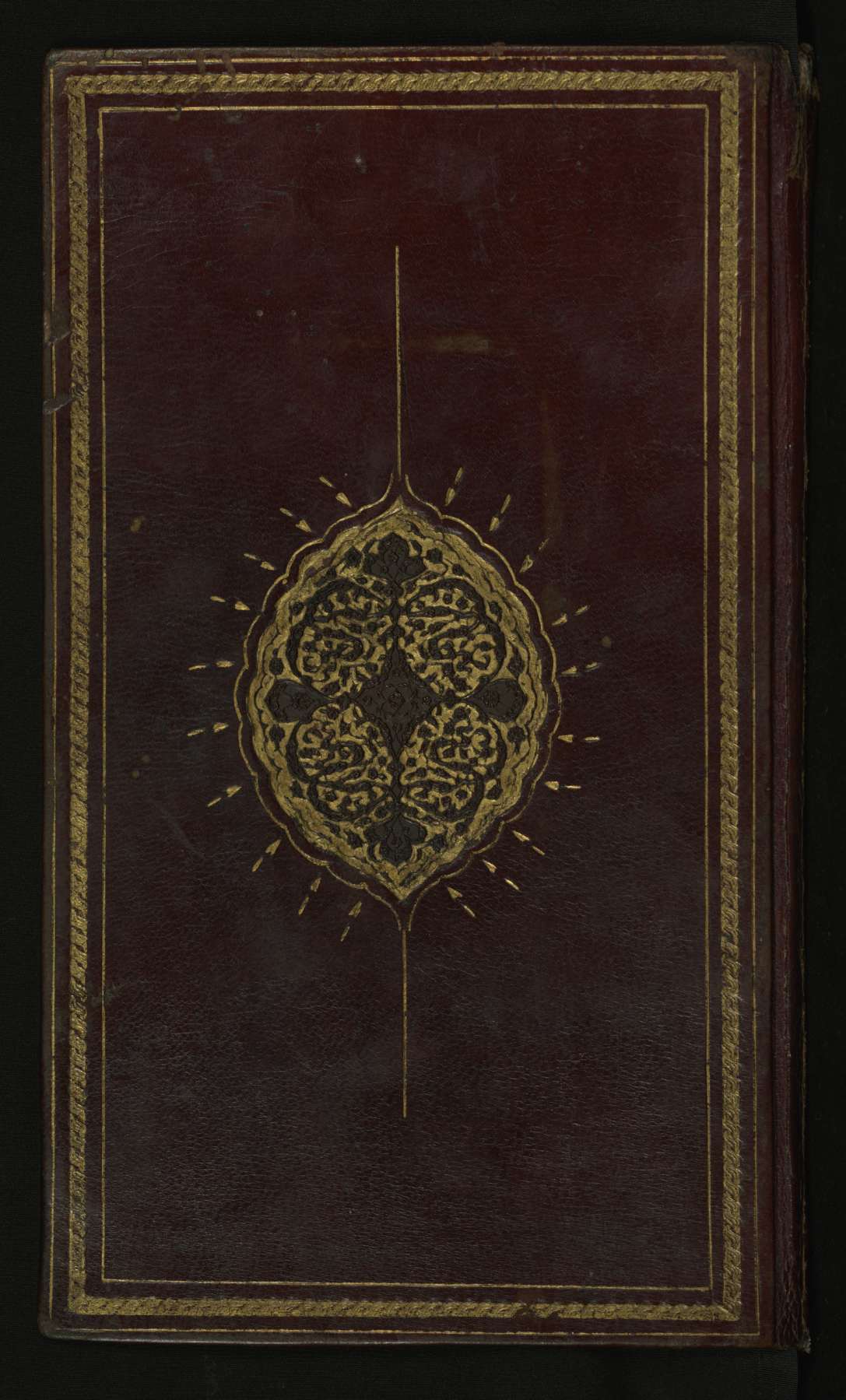
Ali Dede the Bosnian's book Three Hundred Sixty Sufi Questions

During the Safavid dynasty of Iran, "both the wandering dervishes of 'low' Sufism" and "the philosopher-ulama of 'high' Sufism came under relentless pressure" from powerful cleric Mohammad-Baqer Majlesi (d. 1110/1699). Majlesi—"one of the most powerful and influential" Twelver Shiʿi ulama "of all time"—was famous for (among other things), suppression of Sufism, which he and his followers believed paid insufficient attention to Shariah law. Prior to Majlesi's rise, Shia Islam and Sufism had been "closely linked".

In 1843, the Senussi Sufi were forced to flee Mecca and Medina and head to Sudan and Libya.

After the Sheikh Said rebellion, Mustafa Kemal Atatürk, first President of the newly founded Republic of Turkey, banned the Sufi orders in 1925. Iranian reformer Ahmad Kasravi participated in burning Sufi literature. Though Sufism has declined in the past century, it has enjoyed a resurgence in Turkey and artworks on Sufi themes may be found exhibited in the art galleries of Istanbul, such as the work Miracname by artist Erol Akyavas, which depicts time and the cosmos as symbols of the "miraculous journey". In Iran, prominent figures in Iranian intellectual circles continue to be influenced by Sufi traditions including Ruhollah Khomeini and Ali Shariati.

== Current attacks ==
In recent years, shrines, and sometimes mosques, have been damaged or destroyed in many parts of the Muslim world. Some Sufi adherents have been killed as well. Ali Gomaa, a Sufi scholar and Grand Mufti of al-Azhar University, has criticized the destruction of shrines and public property as unacceptable.

=== Bangladesh ===
Islam spread in Bangladesh through Sufis but in recent years have been under attack to impose a more stricter interpretation of Islam. Sufi Leaders Muhammad Shahidullah and Farhad Hossain Chowdhury were assassinated in 2016 and 2017 respectively.

Shariat Sarkar, a baul singer, was detained in January 2020 was detained following a case filed by an Islamic cleric after Sarker said Islam did not prohibit music.

Following the fall of the Sheikh Hasina led Awami League government, radical Islamist were attacking liberals, religious minorities, and Sufis. Since the collapse more than 80 shrines have been vandalized in Bangladesh. According to the Global Sufi Organization, six Sufi practitioners have been killed and dozens were injured in attacks.

=== Pakistan ===
The persecution of Sufis and the Sufi tradition has encompassed various forms of oppression, including the destruction of Sufi shrines and mosques, the suppression of Sufi orders, acts of violence, and discrimination against Sufi adherents in several Muslim-majority nations, such as Pakistan.

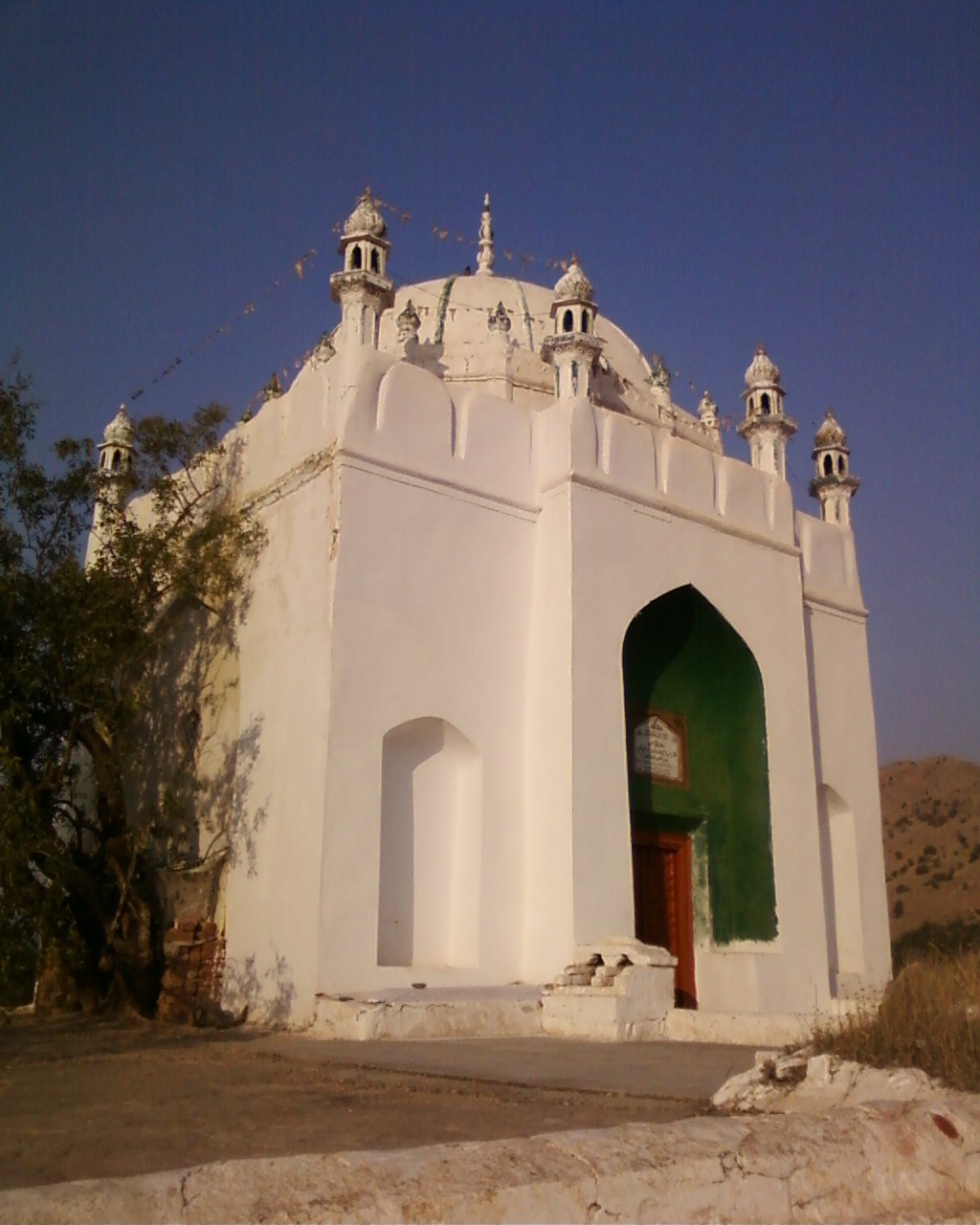
Tomb of Syed Abdul Rahim Shah Bukhari, constructed by Mughal emperor Aurangzeb (17th century)

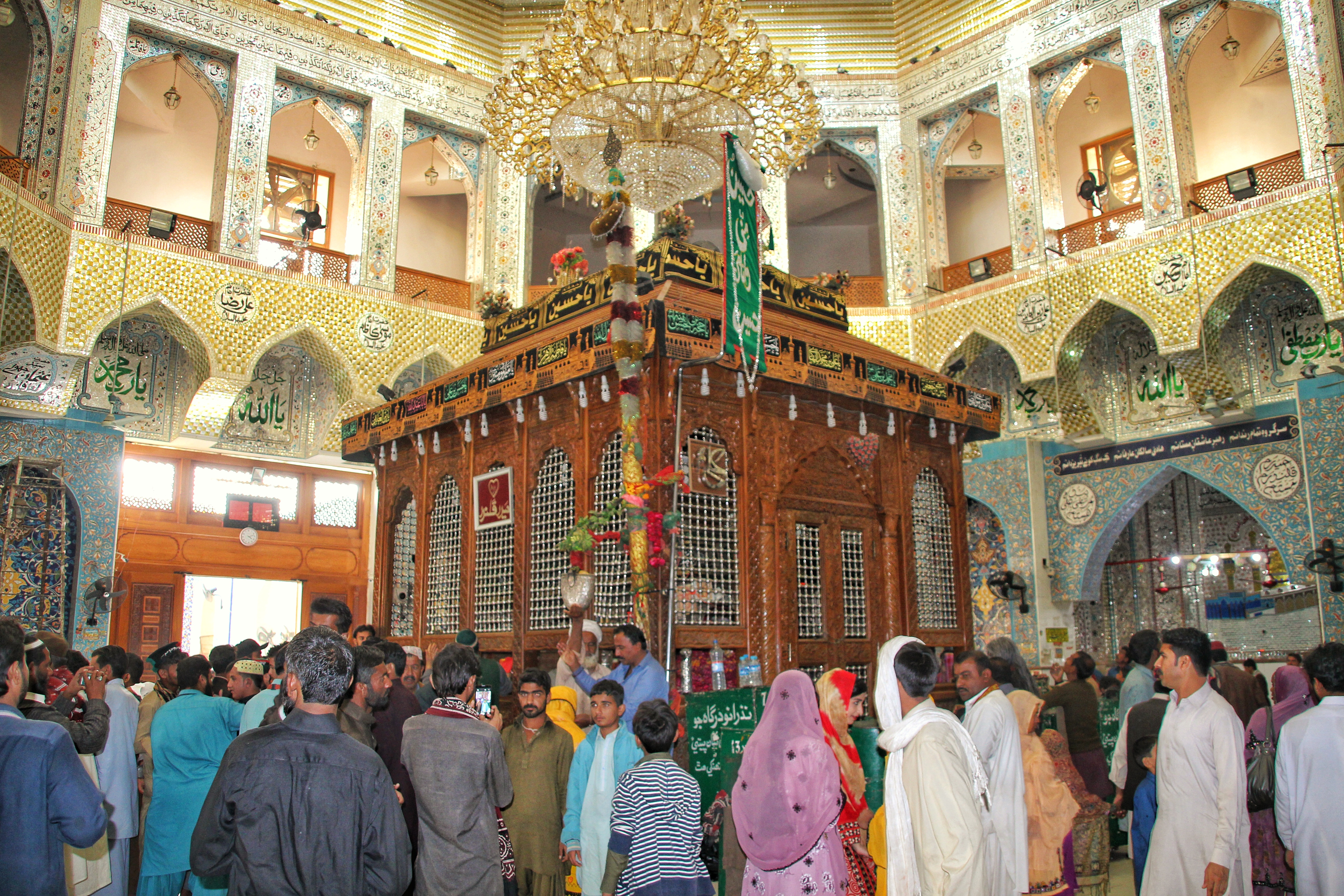
Muslim pilgrims gathered around the Ḍarīẖ covering the grave (qabr) of the 13th-century Sufi saint Lal Shahbaz Qalandar (shrine located in Sehwan Sharif); on 16 February 2017, ISIS claimed responsibility for a suicide attack on the shrine which resulted in the deaths of 90 people.

Since March 2005, 209 people have been killed and 560 people have been injured in 29 different terrorist attacks which targeted shrines devoted to Sufi saints in Pakistan, according to data which has been compiled by the Center for Islamic Research Collaboration and Learning (CIRCLe, a think-tank which is based in Rawalpindi). At least as of 2010, the number of attacks has increased each year. Pro-Sufi Barelvi dominate Pakistan's religious landscape, and as a result, they are victims of the anti-Sufi campaigns which are being waged against them by the Deobandi, according to John Schmidt, lawyer and former United States Associate Attorney General (1994–1997). Deobandi and Barelvi are the "two major sub-sects" of Sunni Muslims in South Asia that have clashed—sometimes violently—since the late 1970s in Pakistan. It is not clear whether Sufis are being persecuted by Barelvi or Deobandi state banned militant organizations, since both groups have been accused of anti-Shia terrorism.

In 2005, militant organizations began attacking "symbols" of the Barelvi community such as mosques, prominent religious leaders, and shrines.

==== Timeline ====
2005

- 19 March: a suicide bomber kills at least 35 people and injured many more at the shrine of Pir Rakhel Shah in remote village of Fatehpur located in Jhal Magsi District of Balochistan. The dead included Shia and Sunni devotees.
- 27 May: As many as 20 people are killed and 100 injured when a suicide-bomber attacks a gathering at Bari Imam Shrine during the annual festival. The dead were mainly Shia. According to the police members of Sipah-i-Sahaba Pakistan (SSP) and Lashkar-e-Jhangvi (LJ) were involved. Sipah-e-Sahaba Pakistan (SSP), were arrested from Thanda Pani and police seized two hand grenades from their custody.

2006

- 11 April: A suicide-bomber attacked a celebration of the birthday of Muhammad (Mawlid) in Karachi's Nishtar Park organised by the Barelvi Jamaat Ahle Sunnat. 57 died including almost the entire leadership of the Sunni Tehrik; over 100 were injured. Three people associated with Lashkar-e-Jhangvi were put on trial for the bombing. (see: Nishtar Park bombing)

2007

- 18 December: The shrine of Abdul Shakoor Malang Baba is demolished by explosives.

2008

- March 3: ten villagers killed in a rocket attack on the 400-year-old shrine of Abu Saeed Baba. Lashkar-e-Islam takes credit.

2009

- 17 February: Agha Jee shot and killed in Peshwar, the fourth faith healer killed over several months in Pakistan. Earlier Pir Samiullah was killed in Swat by the Taliban 16 December 2008. His dead body was later exhumed and desecrated. Pir Rafiullah was kidnapped from Nowshera and his beheaded body was found in Matani area of Peshawar. Pir Juma Khan was kidnapped from Dir Lower and his beheaded body was found near Swat. Faith healing is associated with Sufi Islam in Pakistan and suppressing it has been a cause of "extremist" Muslims there.

Pakistani faith healers are known as pirs, a term that applies to the descendants of Sufi Muslim saints. Under Sufism, those descendants are thought to serve as conduits to God. The popularity of pirs as a viable healthcare alternative stems from the fact that, in much of rural Pakistan, clinics don't exist or are dismissed as unreliable. For the urban wealthy, belief in a pir's powers is either something passed down through the generations, or a remedy of last resort, a kind of Pakistani laetrile.

- 5 March: The shrine of Rahman Baba, "the most famous Sufi Pashto language poet", razed to the ground by Taliban militants "partly because local women had been visiting the shrine".
- 8 March: Attack on shrine of "famous Sufi poet" Rahman Baba (1653–1711) in Peshawar. "The high intensity device almost destroyed the grave of the Rehman Baba and the gates of a mosque, canteen and conference hall situated in the spacious Rehman Baba Complex. Police said the bombers had tied explosives around the pillars of the tombs, to pull down the mausoleum".
- 8 May: shrine of Shaykh Omar Baba destroyed.
- 12 June: Mufti Sarfraz Ahmed Naeemi killed by suicide bomber in Lahore. A leading Sunni Islamic cleric in Pakistan he was well known for his moderate views and for publicly denouncing the Taliban's beheadings and suicide bombings as "un-Islamic".

2010

- 22 June: Taliban militants blow up the Mian Umar Baba shrine in Peshawar. No fatalities reported.
- 1 July: Multiple bombings of Data Durbar Complex Sufi shrine, in Lahore, Punjab. Two suicide bombers blew themselves up killing at least 50 people and injuring 200 others.
- 7 October: 10 people killed, 50 injured in a double suicide bombing attack on Abdullah Shah Ghazi shrine in Karachi
- 7 October: The tomb of Baba Fariddudin Ganj Shakkar in Pakpattan is attacked. Six people were killed and 15 others injured.
- 25 October: Six killed and at least twelve wounded in an attack on the shrine of 12th-century saint, Baba Farid Ganj Shakar in Pakpattan.
- 14 December: Attack on Ghazi Baba shrine in Peshawar; three killed.

2011

- 3 February: Remote-controlled device is triggered as food is being distributed among the devotees outside the Baba Haider Saieen shrine in Lahore, Punjab. At least three people were killed and 27 others injured.
- 3 April: Twin suicide attack leaves 42 dead and almost a hundred injured during the annual Urs festival at shrine of 13th century Sufi saint Sakhi Sarwar (a.k.a. Ahmed Sultan) in the Dera Ghazi Khan district of Punjab province. Tehrik-i-Taliban Pakistan (TTP) claims responsibility for the attack.

2012

- 21 June: Bomb kills three people and injures 31 others at the Pinza Piran shrine in Hazarkhwani in Peshawar. "A police official said the bomb was planted in a donkey-cart that went off in the afternoon when a large number of people were visiting the popular shrine".

2016

- 22 June: Popular Sufi Qawwali singer Amjad Sabri shot and killed in Pakistan's largest city of Karachi.
- 12 November: Bomb kills 52 and injures over a hundred at shrine of Sufi saint Syed Bilawal Shah Noorani in Balochistan

2017

- 17 February: An ISIS suicide attack kills 90 people and injures a further 343 at the Sufi Shahbaz Qalandar shrine in Sehwan in southern Pakistan.
- 5 October: A suicide bomb attack on a Sufi shrine in Jhal Magsi in Balochistan province kills 18, injures 27.

2019

- 8 May: Bombing on the second day of Ramadan at the Data Darbar shrine of the 11th-century Sufi saint, Abul Hasan Ali Bin Usman, kills 10 and wounds at least 20 people.

=== Jammu and Kashmir, India ===
In this predominantly Muslim, traditionally Sufi region, some six places of worship have been either completely or partially burnt in "mysterious fires" in several months leading up to November 2012. The most prominent victim of damage was the Dastageer Sahib Sufi shrine in Srinagar which burned in June 2012, injuring 20. While investigators have so far found no sign of arson, according to journalist Amir Rana the fires have occurred within the context of a surging Salafi movement which preaches that "Kashmiri tradition of venerating the tombs and relics of saints is outside the pale of Islam".

Mourners outside the burning shrine cursed the Salafis for creating an atmosphere of hate, [while] some Salafis began posting incendiary messages on Facebook, terming the destruction of the shrine a "divine act of God".

=== Somalia ===
Under the Al-Shabab rule in Somalia, Sufi ceremonies were banned and shrines destroyed. As the power of Al-Shabab has waned, however, Sufi ceremonies are said to have "re-emerged". Ahlu Sunna Waljama'a Sufi militants, backed by Ethiopia and the federal government, control parts of central Somalia and some cities in the southern regions of Gedo and Bakool.

=== Mali ===
In the ancient city of Timbuktu, sometimes called "the city of 333 saints", UNESCO reports that as many as half of the city's shrines "have been destroyed in a display of fanaticism", as of July 2012. A spokesman for Ansar Dine has stated that "the destruction is a divine order", and that the group had plans to destroy every single Sufi shrine in the city, "without exception". In Gao and Kidal, as well as Timbuktu, Salafi Islamists have destroyed musical instruments and driven musicians into "economic exile" away from Mali.

International Criminal Court Chief Prosecutor Fatou Bensouda described the Islamists' actions as a "war crime".

A manuscript from Timbuktu belonging to Al-Mukhtar ibn Aḥmad ibn Abi Bakr al-Kunti al-Kabir

A manuscript from Timbuktu belonging to Baba ibn Ahmad al-Alawi al-Maliki al-Maghribi al-Shingiti

=== Egypt ===
A May 2010 ban by the ministry of awqaf (religious endowments) of centuries old Sufi dhikr gatherings (devoted to the remembrance of God, and including dancing and religious songs) has been described as "another victory for extreme Salafi thinking at the expense of Egypt's moderate Sufism". Clashes followed at Cairo's Al-Hussein Mosque and al-Sayyida Zeinab mosques between members of Sufi orders and security forces who forced them to evacuate the two shrines. In 2009, the moulid of al-Sayyida Zeinab, Muhammad's granddaughter, was banned ostensibly over concern over the spread of swine flu but also at the urging of Salafis.

According to Gaber Qassem, deputy of the Sufi Orders, approximately 14 shrines have been violated in Egypt since the January 2011 revolution. According to Sheikh Tarek El-Rifai, head of the Rifai Sufi Order, a number of Salafis have prevented Sufi prayers in Al-Haram. Sheikh Rifai said that the order's lawyer has filed a report at the Al-Haram police station to that effect. In early April 2011, a Sufi march from Al-Azhar Mosque to Al-Hussein Mosque was followed by a massive protest before Al-Hussein Mosque, "expressing outrage at the destruction" of Sufi shrines. The Islamic Research Centre of Egypt, led by Grand Imam of Al-Azhar Ahmed El-Tayeb, has also denounced the attacks on the shrines. According to the Muslim Brotherhood website ikhwanweb.com, in 2011 "a memorandum was submitted to the Armed Forces" citing 20 "encroachments" on Sufi shrines.

On 24 November 2017, a group of Islamic terrorists attacked the Sufi-connected al-Rawda mosque, located in Sinai. At least 305 people were killed and more than 100 wounded during the attack; it is considered one of the worst terrorist attacks in the history of modern Egypt. Most of the victims were Sufis. The mosque is associated with the Jaririya order.

=== Libya ===
In the aftermath of the 2011 Libyan Civil War, several Sufi religious sites in Libya were deliberately destroyed or damaged. In the weeks leading up to September 2012, "armed groups motivated by their religious views" attacked Sufi religious sites across the country, "destroying several mosques and tombs of Sufi religious leaders and scholars". Perpetrators were described as "groups that have a strict Islamic ideology where they believe that graves and shrines must be desecrated." Libyan Interior Minister Fawzi Abdel A'al, was quoted as saying, "If all shrines in Libya are destroyed so we can avoid the death of one person [in clashes with security forces], then that is a price we are ready to pay."

In September 2012, three people were killed in clashes between residents of Rajma, 50 kilometres (31 mi) southeast of Benghazi, and Salafist Islamists trying to destroy a Sufi shrine in Rajma, the Sidi al-Lafi mausoleum. In August 2012 the United Nations cultural agency UNESCO urged Libyan authorities to protect Sufi mosques and shrines from attacks by Islamic hardliners "who consider the traditional mystical school of Islam heretical". The attack had "wrecked mosques in at least three cities and desecrated many graves of revered Sufi scholars".

=== Tunisia ===
Tunisian Sufis largely adher to the Shadiliyya order. Despite the rise of Salafism and extremists in Tunisia, Sufism is still largely ingrained in its culture. Media site Al-Monitor reported that 39 Sufi shrines were destroyed or desecrated from the 2011 revolution to January 2013. For Tunisians Sufism is a way of collective healing and progress. The polling agency Sigma indicated that 43.1% Tunisians visit a Sufi shrine at least once per year. Sufi Shrines (Zawiya) in Tunisia exceed the number of mosques.

=== North Caucasus ===
Said Atsayev—also known as Sheikh Said Afandi al-Chirkavi—a prominent 74-year-old Sufi Muslim spiritual leader in Dagestan, Russia, was killed by a suicide bombing August 28, 2012 along with six of his followers. His murder follows "similar religiously motivated killings" in Dagestan and regions of ex-Soviet Central Asia, targeting religious leaders—not necessarily Sufi—who disapprove of violent jihad. Afandi had survived previous attempts on his life and was reportedly in the process of negotiating a peace agreement between the Sufis and Salafis.

=== Iran ===
Matthijs van den Bos discusses the status of Sufism in Iran in the 19th and 20th century. According to Seyed Mostafa Azmayesh, an expert on Sufism and the representative of the Ni'matullāhī order outside Iran, a campaign against the Sufis in Iran (or at least Shia Sufis) began in 2005. Several books were published arguing that because Sufis follow their own spiritual leaders they do not believe in the Islamic state's theocratic principle of the governance of the jurist and should therefore be treated as second-class citizens, not allowed to have government jobs, or be fired if they do. Since then, the Ni'matullāhī order—Iran's largest Sufi order—has come under increasing state pressure. Three of its khanqahs have been demolished. Officials accused it of not having building permits and of narcotics possession—charges which the Sufis reject.

The government of Iran is considering an outright ban on Sufism, according to the 2009 Annual Report of the United States Commission on International Religious Freedom. It also reports:

In February 2009, at least 40 Sufis in Isfahan were arrested after protesting the destruction of a Sufi place of worship; all were released within days.

In January, Jamshid Lak, a Gonabadi Dervish from the Nematollahi Sufi order was flogged 74 times after being convicted in 2006 of slander following his public allegation of ill-treatment by a Ministry of Intelligence official.

In late December 2008, after the closure of a Sufi place of worship, authorities arrested without charge at least six members of the Gonabadi Dervishes on Kish Island and confiscated their books and computer equipment; their status is unknown.

In November 2008, Amir Ali Mohammad Labaf was sentenced to a five-year prison term, 74 lashes, and internal exile to the southeastern town of Babak for spreading lies, based on his membership in the Nematollahi Gonabadi Sufi order.

In October, at least seven Sufi Muslims in Isfahan, and five others in Karaj, were arrested because of their affiliation with the Nematollahi Gonabadi Sufi order; they remain in detention.

In November 2007, clashes in the western city of Borujerd between security forces and followers of a mystic Sufi order resulted in dozens of injuries and the arrests of approximately 180 Sufi Muslims. The clashes occurred after authorities began bulldozing a Sufi monastery. It is unclear how many remain in detention or if any charges have been brought against those arrested. During the past year, there were numerous reports of Shi'a clerics and prayer leaders, particularly in Qom, denouncing Sufism and the activities of Sufi Muslims in the country in both sermons and public statements.

In 2009 the mausoleum of the 19th century Sufi poet Nasir Ali and an adjoining Sufi prayer house were bulldozed.

Between 4 February and March 2018, Iranian Sufis organized the 2018 Dervish protests, protesting the imprisonment of at least 10 of the group's members in Fars province. On 19 February, the Sufis organized a sit-in protest at a police station, located in the Pasdaran district of Tehran, where one of their members was held. Later, clashes broke out between the Sufi protestors and security forces. Police used tear gas in an attempt to disperse the protesters. Five riot police were killed. According to the Iranian press, police arrested around 300 people, and there have been reports that some of the protesters may have been killed.

Not all Sufis in Iran have been subject to government pressure. Sunni dervish orders—such as the Qhaderi dervishes—in the Sunni-populated parts of the country are thought by some to be seen as allies of the government against Al-Qaeda.

== See also ==
- Sufi-Salafi relations
- 2017 Sinai mosque attack
