= Kaddish (disambiguation) =

Kaddish is a Jewish prayer.

Kaddish may also refer to:

== Places ==
- Kadisha Valley, in Lebanon, also transliterated Kaddish or Qadish

== Literature ==
- Kaddish (poem), a 1961 poem by Allen Ginsberg
- Kaddish and Other Poems, a 1961 book of poems by Allen Ginsberg
- Kadish, a 1998 book by Leon Wieseltier
- Kaddish, a book on the Nazis by Yehiel De-Nur

== Film and TV ==
- Kaddish (1924 film), a German silent drama film
- Kaddish (2019 film), a Russian film
- Kaddish (The X-Files), an X-Files episode

== Music ==
- Kaddish (band), a Scottish screamo band

=== Classical compositions ===
- Kaddish, baroque composition by Salamone Rossi
- Kaddish (Poem Op. 6), composition for piano and oboe by Alexander Veprik (1899–1958)
- Kaddish (symphony), a symphony by Leonard Bernstein
- Kaddish, composition for symphony by Henri Lazarof (1932–2013)
- Kaddish, composition for piano and cello by Mark Kopytman (1929–2011)
- Kaddish, composition for piano and cello by Joachim Stutschewsky (1891–1982)
- Symphony No. 21 (Weinberg) ("Kaddish"), composition by Mieczysław Weinberg (1919–1996)

=== Albums ===
- Kaddish (Towering Inferno album), 1993
- Kaddish (Salem album), 1994

== See also ==
- Kadish
- Kiddush
- Qadesh (disambiguation)
