= Q-D-Š =

Triconsonantal Semitic root meaning "sacred, holy"

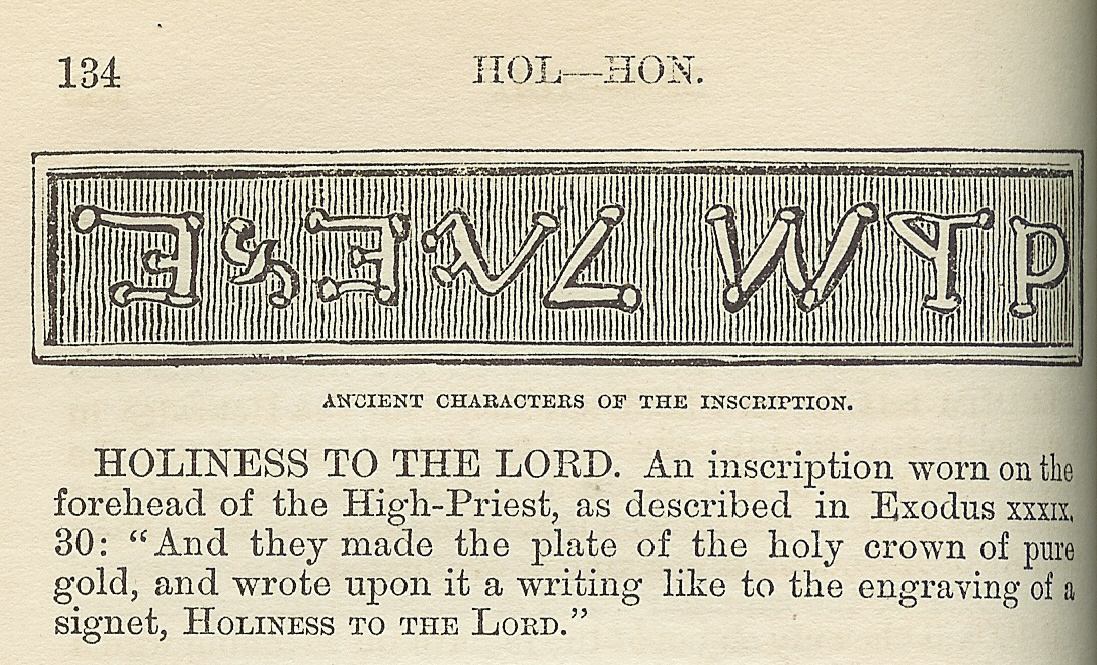
Qodeš l-Yahweh (Paleo-Hebrew alphabet), "Holy to Yahweh", an inscription worn on the forehead of the High Priest of Israel

Q-D-Š is a triconsonantal Semitic root meaning "sacred, holy", derived from a concept central to ancient Semitic religion. From a basic verbal meaning "to consecrate, to purify", it could be used as an adjective meaning "holy", or as a substantive referring to a "sanctuary, sacred object, sacred personnel."

The root is reflected as q-d-š (Phoenician 𐤒-𐤃-𐤔, Hebrew ק־ד־ש) in Northwest Semitic and as q-d-s (Arabic: ق-د-س) in Central and South Semitic. In Akkadian texts, the verb conjugated from this root meant to "clean, purify."

== Canaanite religion ==
The root was used this way in Ugaritic, as for example, in the words qidšu (meaning "holy place" or "chapel") and qad(i)šu (meaning "consecrated gift" or "cultic personnel"). In some Ugaritic texts, qdš is used as a divine epithet. For example, the gods are referred to as "the sons of holiness" or "the holy ones" (bn qdš), and in the Ugaritic Legend of Keret, the hero is described as "the son of El and the offspring of the Benevolent One and qdš ".

William Foxwell Albright believed that Qudšu (meaning "holiness") was a common Canaanite appellation for the goddess Asherah, and Albright's mentee Frank Moore Cross claimed qdš was used as a divine epithet for both Asherah and the Ugaritic goddess, Athirat. Johanna Stucky claims she may have been a deity in her own right.

Depictions of a goddess in inscriptions from Dynastic Egypt, thought to be Canaanite since she is referred to as Qdš (often transliterated in English as Qedesha, Qudshu or Qetesh), show a woman in the nude, with curly hair and raised arms carrying lilies and serpents. Qdš is also depicted in the pantheon of gods at Memphis, Egypt possibly indicating worship of her as independent deity there. The word qdš also appears in the Pyrgi Tablets, a Phoenician text found in Italy that dates back to 500 BCE.

== Hebrew ==
Qudšu was later used in Jewish Aramaic to refer to God.

Words derived from the root qdš appear some 830 times in the Hebrew Bible. Its use in the Hebrew Bible evokes ideas of separation from the profane, and proximity to the Otherness of God, while in nonbiblical Semitic texts, recent interpretations of its meaning link it to ideas of consecration, belonging, and purification.

The Hebrew language is called "The Holy Tongue" (Hebrew: לשון הקודש "Lashon HaKodesh") in Judaism. In addition, the Hebrew term for the Holy Temple in Jerusalem is Beit Hamikdash (בית המקדש, "the holy house"), and Ir Ha-Kodesh (עיר הקודש, "City of the Holy"), the latter being one of the tens of Hebrew names for Jerusalem.

Three theological terms that come from this root are Kiddush, which is sanctification of the Sabbath or a festival with a blessing over wine before the evening and noon meals, Kaddish, which is the sanctification prayer, and mourner's prayer, and Kedushah which is the responsive section of the reader's repetition of the Amidah.

Qedeshah (קדשה) is a word derived from the Q-D-Š root, which is used in the Hebrew Bible to describe a particular sort of woman. Historically this has been understood to be a sacred prostitute in a temple fertility cult. However modern scholarship has revealed that the evidence for this is extremely tenuous. Modern scholars have provided significant criticism of the common belief that any culture in the Mediterranean and Ancient Near East ever practised sacred prostitution. Mayer Gruber (1986) suggested the word's usage reflected a more primitive base-meaning in the Q-D-Š root of "set apart", hence "she who is set apart for sexual services, a prostitute". But this interpretation of the root has not generally been taken up. The question of how a word with a root meaning of "consecrated one" evidently came to be associated with common prostitution continues to be a topic of ongoing discussion.

Two different words describing places in the Hebrew Bible use this root. One is Kedesh, which refers to a Canaanite village first documented in Joshua 20:7 and later in 2 Kings 15:29. The other is Kadesh, a place in the south of Ancient Israel, mentioned in Numbers 13:26 and Deuteronomy 2:14.

Root: Q-D-Š (קדש): meaning "holy" or "set apart"
Hebrew^{[Note]}	Transliteration	Lexical category	Gender	Definition
קֹדֶשׁ	qodesh	noun	masculine	holiness
קִדֵּשׁ	qiddesh	verb		to sanctify; to make kiddush
נתקדש	nitqadesh	verb		(Talmudic) to be betrothed, to be married
מִקְדָּשׁ	miqdash	noun	masculine	temple
מְקֻדָּשׁ	m'qudash	adjective		holy, sacred, sanctified
מֻקְדָּשׁ	muqdash	adjective		dedicated, devoted
קִדּוּשׁ	qidush	noun	masculine	(Jewish ritual) Kiddush
קַדִּישׁ	qadish	noun	masculine	(Jewish ritual) Kaddish
קְדֻשָּׁה	q'dusha	noun	feminine	sanctity, purity, holiness; (Jewish ritual) Kedushah
קָדֵשׁ	qadesh	noun	masculine	(pagan ritual) male cult functionary; later considered a male prostitute
קְדֵשָׁה	qdesha	noun	feminine	meaning disputed, describes either cult prostitute or other cultic functionary
קֶדֶשׁ	qedesh	noun		(Canaanite village) Kedesh
קָדֵשׁ	qadesh	noun		(Place in the south of Ancient Israel) Kadesh

== Arabic ==
The verb form of Q-D-S in Arabic (qadus) means "to be holy" or "to be pure, immaculate". Quds can be used as a noun to denote "paradise" or as an adjective meaning "purity" or "holiness". The definite noun form, al-Quds (Arabic: القدس, "the holy one"), is the most common of seventeen Arabic Names of Jerusalem and derives from the Aramaean word for "temple" (qōdšā). The Turkish word for Jerusalem, Kudüs, derives from the Arabic name. Two other names for Jerusalem also derive from the Q-D-S root: Bayt al-Muqqadas ("the holy house") and Bayt al-Maqdis. The wider area around Jerusalem, or the Holy Land, is referred to in Arabic and in Islamic sources as al ard al-muqaddasa (also Bilād al-Muqaddasa), as it is full of shrines and connections to prophets and saints. The Christian Bible is known in Arabic as al-Kitāb al-Muqaddas. Muqaddas in Arabic means not only "holy" and "sacred", but also "hallowed, sanctified, dedicated, consecrated."

Al-Quds also appears in Arabic as part of a phrase to refer to the Holy Spirit, Rúḥu 'l-Quds (or Rūḥu 'l'Qudus), with Ruh meaning "spirit". This phrase appears in the Qur'an a number of times, where it is thought to refer in some cases to the angel Gabriel.

The concept of Rúḥu 'l-Quds is also discussed at length by the Sufi mystic, ʻAbd al-Karim al-Jili, who further distinguishes between two other concepts derived from the Q-D-S root in Arabic: qudsi ("holy one") and aqdasi ("most holy one"). The qudsi is one who "unceasingly contemplates the Divine consciousness sirr ['secret'], which is his origin" and is "illuminated" by it, whereas the aqdasi ("most holy one") is one who is actually united with this Essence.

Qudsi is also used in Arabic to refer to a Jerusalemite, or a native/resident of Jerusalem. It and its derivatives, such as Maqdisi and al-Muqaddasi are used in Arabic surnames or as appellatives assigned to those who come from or live in Jerusalem.

The religious terms Hadith Qudsi ("holy hadith") and Tafsir Qudsi ("sacred commentary") also incorporate qudsi, though in this case it is used as an adjective, rather than a noun or pronoun. Tafsir Qudsi is a form of Quranic commentary, while Hadith Qudsi refers to the "utterances of God through the Prophet", thus enjoying a status higher than that the hadith writings in general, though lower than that of the Qur'an.

Other derivatives of Q-D-S in Arabic include qudus, which means "purity", "sanctity", "saint" or "holy", and qadas, which is used to refer to a "small cup or plate", often used to put forth offerings at holy sites. Taqdis means to "purify, sanctify, consecrate to God," taqqadus is to "be purified, sanctified, consecrated," and taqâdus means to "play the saint". Istiqdas means "to deem holy."

== Maltese ==
The root Q-D-S in Maltese is used in a religious sense, and means "holy, sanctified, saintly", its use is very similar to that of Christian Arabs, as the Maltese language uses mostly Arabic terms and even some Muslim terms in religion. Some examples are qaddis (holy, saint), tqaddis (sanctification), qdusija (holiness, saintliness), maqdas (temple, place of worship), mqaddes (sacred, hallowed) and quddiesa (mass), amongst many more.

== See also ==
- Asherah
- Battle of Kadesh
- Bris Kodesh
- Kadesh Campaign
- Kadosh
- Kitáb-i-Aqdas
- Kodesh Hakodashim
- Qadas
- Qadesh (disambiguation)
- Sifrei Kodesh

== Bibliography ==
- Albright, William Foxwell (1990), Yahweh and the Gods of Canaan: A Historical Analysis of Two Contrasting Faiths, EISENBRAUNS, ISBN 0-931464-01-3
- Becking, Bob; Dijkstra, Meindert; Vriezen, Karel J. H. (2001), Only One God?: Monotheism in Ancient Israel and the Veneration of the Goddess Asherah, Continuum International Publishing Group, ISBN 1-84127-199-3
- Glassé, Cyril; Smith, Huston (2001), The New Encyclopedia of Islam: A Revised Edition of the Concise Encyclopedia of Islam, AltaMira Press, ISBN 0-7591-0189-2
- Hadley, Judith M. (2000), The Cult of Asherah in Ancient Israel and Judah: Evidence for a Hebrew Goddess, Cambridge University Press, ISBN 0-521-66235-4
- van der Toorn, K.; Becking, Bob; van der Horst, Pieter Willem (1999), Dictionary of Deities and Demons in the Bible, Wm. B. Eerdmans Publishing, ISBN 0-8028-2491-9
