= Eid Abu Jarir =

Sufi Sheikh

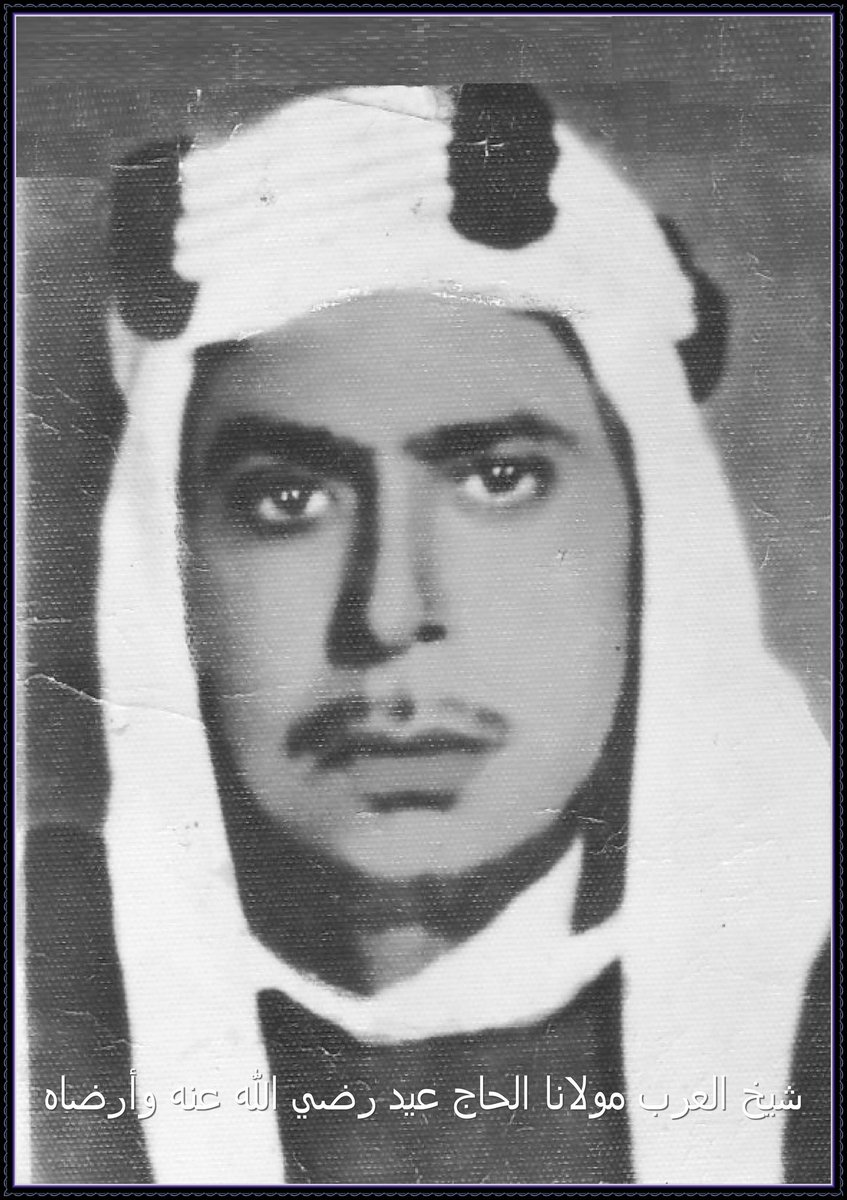
Eid Abu Jarir.

Eid Abu Jarir (Arabic: عيد أبو جرير; 1910–1971) was a Sufi shaykh who founded the eponymous Jaririya Sufi order in Sinai, Egypt. Alongside his teacher Abu Ahmed al-Ghazawi, who founded the Alawi-Ahmadi tariqah, he is considered one of the founders of Sufism in the Sinai Peninsula. He was a member of the Jarir clan of the al-Sawarka tribe. The main three Sufi lodges he established, starting in the winter of 1953–1954, are the Sa’ud lodge in Sharqia, the Arab lodge in Ismailia, and the Rawdah lodge in North Sinai, the last of which was attacked in the 2017 Sinai mosque attack. He was part of the Sinai Mujahideen, which fought against Israel alongside the Egyptian military in the 1967 to 1970 War of Attrition. He was driven out of North Sinai in the 1960s, and lived the rest of his life and has his tomb in Sa'ed, El Husseiniya, near Cairo. Under law number 118 for the year 1976, his Jariri order is officially registered by the Egyptian government.
