= Sinai Mujahideen =

The Sinai Mujahideen were a militant group during the War of Attrition between Egypt and Israel. It was initially organized when Egyptian military intelligence reached out to Eid Abu Jarir, who was asked to recruit seven fellow tribal members, and helped start three branches based in Port Said, Ismailia and Suez. Besides Jarir, it drew strength from other Bedouin Sufi Darqawa figures such as Khalaf al-Khalafat, as well as its most important military leader, Hassan Khalaf. In 1997, A veterans group under this name is currently organized under the Egyptian NGO Law, which has also been active in opposing Ansar Bait al-Maqdis.
