= Ostrakine =

- Ὀστρακίνη (Ancient Greek)
- Ostracena; Ras Straki راس ستركي
- Location within Egypt
- 31°7′17.6″N 33°25′27.69″E
- Type: City, harbor
- Periods: Classical, Roman, Byzantine and Early Islamic periods
- Location: Ras Straki (Gazirat El-Felusiyat), Egypt
- Region: North Sinai

History
- Built: 1st century BC

Site notes
- Area: 2 km^{2} (0.77 sq mi)
- Excavation dates: 1914; 1976–1977
- Archaeologists: Jean Clédat; Eliezer Oren (North Sinai Expedition, Ben‑Gurion University)
- Condition: Mostly buried under silt and marine deposits
- Depicted on the Madaba Map; traditionally associated with the tomb of Habakkuk and the martyrdom of James the Less

Ostrakine (Ancient Greek: Ὀστρακίνη, Latin: Ostracena, Coptic: ⲟⲥⲧⲣⲁⲕⲓⲛⲏ, ⲧⲣⲁⲕⲓⲛⲏ) was an ancient Egyptian city at a location that is known as Ras Straki (Arabic: راس ستركي) or Gazirat El-Felusiyat (Arabic: جزيرة الفلوسيات) today.

The name of the Zaraniq Protected Area (Arabic: الزرانيق) is also derived from Ostrakine.

== Etymology ==
The city's name is believed to be derived from the Greek word "οστρακινος," meaning "earthen" or "made of clay," which is based on the word "οστρακον," meaning "earthen vessel" or "potsherd." The name is sometimes translated as "city of sherds" and is thought to refer to a concentration of potsherds found on the spot. While some scholars have suggested that the name may also be translated as "city of shells," this interpretation is less likely due to the lack of usage of the term "οστρακινος" in this context.

== Location ==
Ostrakine was located on the road between Alexandria and Gaza at Lake Bardawil, a saltwater lagoon near the Mediterranean coast of the northern Sinai.

== History ==
Established as a harbour in the first century BC, near Sirbonis, the longtime border between Egypt and Syria, archaeological evidence suggests that Ostrakine was a centre of glass-making in the classical period. A bishopric during the Byzantine period, there is evidence of three Byzantine churches, and that the town remained important as a stop along the trade route in the early Muslim period.

=== Archaeology ===
The archaeological record demonstrates that Ostrakine supported a sizable and prosperous Christian community in Late Antiquity, closely connected to the traditions of Palestine and Egypt, and likely encouraged by the Egyptian Church. Excavations by Jean Clédat in 1914 revealed well-preserved Byzantine public buildings, including multiple churches and a large fortified complex, possibly a monastery, richly decorated with Christian symbols. Clédat suggested the fortress played a defensive role in protecting Sinai routes into Egypt. He also uncovered Greek ostraca bearing the town's name. In the winter of 1976–1977, archaeological work by the North Sinai Expedition of Ben‑Gurion University documented additional remains, including another church, and demonstrated that Roman–Byzantine Ostrakine was a substantial urban centre, covering roughly 2 km². By the early 1990s, much of the site was buried beneath silt and marine deposits resulting from a rise in sea level during the early Islamic period.

These investigations identified distinct zones, including industrial areas with glass- and metal-working installations, a commercial district with warehouses and shops, and several churches of varying size and plan. One particularly well-preserved basilica, dated to the 5th century, featured an atrium, aisled nave, chancel with altar, marble decoration, carved Christian motifs, and rooms serving liturgical and auxiliary functions, including baptismal and reliquary spaces. Architectural and decorative elements indicate both local building materials and imported marble. Excavations of nearby cemeteries revealed Christian burials marked by Greek epitaphs and crosses, though linguistic features suggest the population's everyday language was Aramaic rather than Greek.

Evidence shows that this church underwent later modifications, with parts converted to domestic and storage use, before being destroyed by a major fire. Coins and stratigraphic data indicate that Ostrakine's Christian community continued to function well after the Persian invasion of the early 7th century and for several decades following the Arab conquest, with worship continuing into the late 7th century. The final destruction of the church may be linked to Umayyad-period military activity.

== Tradition ==
Ostrakine has traditionally been thought to be the site of the tomb of the prophet Habakkuk and the martyrdom of James the Less.

== Madaba Map ==
Ostrakine is depicted on the Madaba Map.

== See also ==
- Pelusium
- List of ancient Egyptian towns and cities
