= Tell el-Qudeirat =

Archaeological site in Egypt

- Tel Kadesh Barnea
- Location within Egypt
- 30°38′53″N 34°25′22″E
- Type: Tell
- Location: Sinai, Egypt

Site notes
- Elevation: 385 m (1,263 ft)
- Excavation dates: 1956, 1976–1982

Tell el-Qudeirat is an archaeological site in the Sinai, about 6 km (3.7 mi) southeast of the Egyptian village of Quseima. It is widely considered to be the location of the biblical Kadesh Barnea. Recently, some authors have referred to it as Tel Kadesh-barnea. Moshe Dothan (1965) referred to it as Tel 'Ein el Qudeirat, while in the early twentieth century Woolley and Lawrence used the spelling Tell Ain el Guderat.

Tell el-Qudeirat is the name of the archaeological mound (the "tell") itself. It sits near Ain el-Qudeirat, which Carol Redmount describes as "the most fertile oasis in northern Sinai". The Ain ("spring") flows out of the ground about 1.5 km (0.93 mi) east of the tell, and the water from it flows west, becoming the Wadi el-Qudeirat. The tell then sits along the northern bank of the wadi, which continues flowing west and then turns toward the north. The tell is located along the southern base of a hill known as Jebel el-Qudeirat.

During the Iron Age, Tell el-Qudeirat was a rectangular fortress, and multiple layers of fortifications have been uncovered. The modern site is a tell, an archaeological mound caused by long-term human habitation. At the lowest level, labelled 4c, are traces of human habitation dated by Israel Finkelstein to the twelfth to tenth centuries BCE. Carol Redmount, on the other hand, claims that the oldest remains at the site date to the tenth century. Tell el-Qudeirat is one of scores of permanent settlements which existed in Iron Age II in the Negev Highlands.

== Archaeological surveys and interpretation ==
The first archaeologists to notice the tell were T. E. Lawrence ("Lawrence of Arabia") and C. L. Woolley in 1914. They described it as "little mound about 200 feet long and 120 feet broad ... in a heap from twelve to fifteen feet high above the corn-fields." They considered their initial work insufficient to accurately date the remains, but suggested a date somewhere in the neighborhood of 1000 BCE for it and the nearby fortresses at Qasr er-Ruheibeh and Bir Birein. They proposed that Tell el-Qudeirat was the biblical Kadesh-Barnea.

Further work on a limited scale ("soundings") was carried out at the tell by Moshe Dothan in 1956. Nelson Glueck (published in 1959), and Yohanan Aharoni (1967) discovered that a large number of other fortresses from the Iron Age also existed in the area, and proposed that these fortresses were built by Israelite kings to increase their influence over this area toward the southern edge of their dominions. Dothan concluded that the fortress itself existed in the eighth to sixth centuries, with evidence of human settlement at the site both before and after the existence of the fortress.

Rudolph Cohen conducted work on a much larger scale in 1976–1982. Cohen concluded that the site in fact contained remains of three fortresses. The first was built in the tenth century, in an oval shape. The second and third were rectangular. The second was built in the 8th century BCE and destroyed in the 7th century BCE. The third seemed to have been built in the second half of the 6th century BCE, during the reign of king Josiah, and was destroyed in 586 BCE when the Babylonians destroyed the Kingdom of Judah. Despite the destruction of this last fortress, people continued to occupy the site for approximately two centuries.

Mordechai Haiman (1994) argued that these settlements were installed by the Israelite United Monarchy between about 1000 and 925 BCE. Haiman held that these sites were abandoned after the kingdom of Israel split and Egypt invaded it around 925 BC. Of these sites, Haiman maintains that only Tell el-Qudeirat and two others were again settled in the eighth century, with Tell el-Qudeirat serving as an outpost of the Kingdom of Judah.

David Ussishkin (1995), on the other hand, argued that Cohen's "second" and "third" fortresses in fact constituted a single fort. While Cohen interpreted the fort as an outpost of the kingdom of Judah, Ussishkin suggested, following Nadav Na'aman, that it was not a project of the Judahite government but was perhaps constructed by Assyrians, later falling into Egyptian hands.

Israel Finkelstein has extended the lines of thinking found in Cohen and Ussishkin, while modifying some of their conclusions. What Cohen saw as an "oval fortress", Finkelstein sees as simply the remains of settlement between the tenth and eighth centuries, prior to any fortress construction. As for the rectangular remains, Finkelstein holds these to have been a single fortress operating from the mid-eighth century to about 600. Later human occupation at the site likely continued into the fourth century.

== Bibliography ==
- Cohen, Rudolph. (1979). "The Iron Age Fortresses in the Central Negev". Bulletin of the American Schools of Oriental Research, (236). doi:10.2307/1356668
- Cohen, Rudolph and Hannah Bernick-Greenberg (2007). Excavations at Kadesh Barnea (Tell el-Qudeirat). Israel Antiquities Authority.
- Dothan, Moshe (1965). "The Fortress at Kadesh-Barnea". Israel Exploration Journal, Vol. 15, No. 3, pp. 134–150.
- Drinkard, Joel F. Jr. (1990). Watson E. Mills; Roger Aubrey Bullard (eds.). Mercer Dictionary of the Bible. Mercer University Press. ISBN 978-0-86554-373-7.
- Finkelstein, Israel (2010). "Kadesh Barnea: A Reevaluation of Its Archaeology and History." Tel Aviv (volume 37).
- Gilboa, Ayelet; Jull, Timothy A. J.; Sharon, Ilan; & Boaretto, Elisabetta (2009). "Notes on Iron IIA 14C Dates from Tell el-Qudeirat (Kadesh Barnea)", Tel Aviv, 36:1, 82–94, DOI: 10.1179/204047809x439460
- Haiman, Mordechai (1994). "The Iron Age II Sites of the Western Negev Highlands". Israel Exploration Journal. Vol. 44, No. 1/2, pp. 59, 61.
- Israel Journal of Botany. Weizmann Science Press of Israel. 1975. pp. 23, 29.
- Haiman, Mordechai (1994) "The Iron Age II Sites of the Western Negev Highlands". Israel Exploration Journal. Vol. 44, No. 1/2, pp. 36–61
- Redmount, Carol (2001). "Bitter Lives: Israel in and Out of Egypt". In Michael David Coogan (ed.). The Oxford History of the Biblical World. Oxford University Press. ISBN 978-0-19-513937-2.
- Ussishkin, David (1995). "The Rectangular Fortress at Kadesh-Barnea". Israel Exploration Journal, Vol. 45, No. 2/3..
- Woolley, C. Leonard and Lawrence, T. E. (1914). The Wilderness of Zin. Palestine Exploration Fund.
