= Kaddish (band) =

Scottish screamo band

- Also known as: Agent Orange
- Origin: Dundee, Scotland
- Genres: Screamo
- Years active: 2001–present
- Labels: Parade Of Spectres, Make-That-A-Take, Les Disques Rabat-Joie, Internationale, Black Lake, This One's For The Crew, Autumn Jams, Boslevan, the Ghost Is Clear, Missed Out
- Members: Dom Smith; John Cumiskey; Chris Mylles
- Past members: Mark

Kaddish (originally Agent Orange) is a Scottish screamo band from Dundee. Formed in 2001 by Mark (vocals), Dom Smith (guitar), John Cumiskey (bass) and Chris Mylles (drums), they released only two demos and one split EP in their first nine years as a band. They were a foundational band to the Scottish emo and screamo scene, with their fusion of the genre with black metal and Scottish folk music melodies being adopted by many subsequent acts throughout the nation. In 2010, they released their self-titled debut album. That year, Mark departed from the band, leading to Smith to take on vocals. Their second album Thick Letters to Friends was released in 2014, followed by What World Was Still? in 2018.

== History ==
The band formed in 2001, in Dundee, under the name Agent Orange. Their founding lineup consisted of Mark (vocals), Dom Smith (guitar), John Cumiskey (bass) and Chris Mylles (drums). They later took the name Kaddish in reference to the Jewish hymn the Kaddish, inspired to do so by the Allen Ginsberg poem "Kaddish" (1956).

During their early years, they helped to establish the Scottish emo, which developed the name "Ecossemo", a portmanteau of Ecosse and emo. The venue they played most frequently in their early years was Conroy's Basement in Dundee. Run by Make That A Take Records, through their participation, it became a central venue to the scene. They recorded their first demo in 2002, then a second in 2006. They performed solely in Dundee and other east coast Scottish cities, introduced to the western coast touring circuit by the metalcore bands Madman is Absolute and Co-Exist. They often shifted between long periods of activity and inactivity. In 2008, they performed in Edinburgh alongside London band Narwhal, who criticised them for solely performing in Scotland. Soon, Battle of Wolf 359, a band featuring members of Narwhal, offered Kaddish a support tour of mainland Europe, which they accepted. During this tour, they performed at Cry Me a River Festival in Peckeloh, Germany.

In 2010, following the release of their debut self-titled album, Mark departed from the band. Smith took on vocal duties instead. On 29 August 2014, they released their second album Thick Letters To Friends, a collaborative release by record labels Black Lake, Make-That-A-Take, Boslevan and the Ghost is Clear Records. That night, they headlinded the album's release show at Kage Nightclub in Dundee, with support from Stonethrower, Carson Wells and the Sinking Feeling (who were last minute replacements for Bonehouse). On 28 November 2018, they premiered their third album What World Was Still? through Idioteq.com, officially released two days later through Black Lake and Make-That-A-Take Records Records. They contributed the song "Scattered Islands Of A Shattered Idea" to the 2022 compilation album This Is Scotland Not LA 2.

== Musical style ==
Critics have categorised Kaddish's music as screamo. They incorporate elements of black metal, progressive rock and jazz. Punktastic writer Samarth Kanal called their style "a brilliant combination of hardcore and emo."

Their songs are chaotic, generally based around stark changes in dynamics, incorporating irregular time signatures, blast beats, singalongs, emotional, pained vocals and melodic guitar playing, sometimes making use of melodies inspired by Scottish folk music. Many of the lyrics on What World Was Still? discussed Brexit.

They have cited influences including Circle Takes the Square, Bruce Springsteen, Tool, Shotmaker, Maximillian Colby, 400 Years and Fugazi, as well as their contemporaries in Santo Caserio, Laeto, Mesa Verde, Meandgoliath, Battle of Wolf 359, Dirtdrinker, Snowblood, Carson Wells, Stonethrower and Bonehouse.

Kaddish were a founding band of the Dundee hardcore scene, influencing bands from the area including Stonethrower, Bonehouse, Please Believe, Mesa Verde and Carson Wells. In a 2019 article, Idioteq editor Karol Kamiński called them "the Scottish royalty of screamo". the Skinny stated that their Thick Letters To Friends "may be the genre-defining LP of the decade." In a 2015 article, Audio Addict writer Steven Fox named them as one of the forefront contemporary screamo bands and the most prominent Scottish screamo band. Their 2010 self-titled album was widely influential upon European screamo bands.

Kaddish pioneered a distinct, Scottish subgenre of emo, merging elements of 2000s mainland European screamo, 1980s Revolution Summer emo and black metal, as well as philosophical and confessional lyrics. Kamiński also used the term "ecossemo" to refer to this style, calling it "Scottish screamo influenced emo".

== Members ==
Current

- Dom Smith – guitar (2001–present), vocals (2010–present)
- John Cumiskey – bass (2001–present)
- Chris Mylles – drums (2001–present)

Former

- Mark Finney – vocals (2001–2010)

== Discography ==
Studio albums

- Kaddish (2010)
- Thick Letters to Friends (2014)
- What World Was Still? (2018)

Splits

- Battle of Wolf 359 / Kaddish (2008; split EP with Battle of Wolf 359)
- Polina / Bonehouse / Kaddish / Todos Caerán (2013; split album with Polina, Bonehouse and Todos Caerán)

Demos

- Demo 1 (2002)
- Demo 2 (2006)
