= Mark J. Kadish =

- Occupations: Judge, professor, attorney, author, and legal commentator

Mark J. Kadish is an American judge, professor, attorney, author, and legal commentator. He received his law degree from New York University in 1967.

== Career ==
Kadish jointly published Volume I of Criminal Law Advocacy, has written numerous articles for professional journals and has lectured nationally. He has been a professor of law at both Emory University and at Georgia State University. Kadish was a faculty member of the Advanced National Trial Advocacy College]and was Co-Faculty Director of the Atlanta Bar Association College of Trial Advocacy as well as the Chair of the Criminal Defense Section of the Association of Trial Lawyers of America.

Kadish's public service includes a review of the Atlanta city court system after appointment by the Mayor of Atlanta. He has taught at Mercer University. He has been a speaker at various judicial conferences. He was a part-time pro hac judge in the Atlanta Municipal Court and is currently a part-time magistrate judge in the State Court of Fulton County. He teaches educational programs to magistrate judges, and is a commentator on various television and radio station programs.

=== My Lai massacre court martial case ===
Kadish served as counsel in the My Lai massacre court martial case which gained worldwide attention because hundreds of undefended Vietnamese civilians were not only killed, but also sexually abused, tortured, beaten, and mutilated. The March 16, 1968 My Lai massacre was a critical event that outraged many people around the world. Kadish's interview of a key witness led attorney F. Lee Bailey to a major turning point in the case. Witnesses appeared to be conflicted between supporting their country's war efforts and balancing humanitarian interests. Some refused to testify while others stated they would perjure themselves in an attempt to find their own justice in the case. The publicity of the My Lai massacre was a major reason support of the Vietnam War reduced both in the United States and around the world. The three men who objected to the My Lai massacre were threatened and publicly humiliated. Thirty years later, the men were honored for their efforts.

=== Other notable cases ===
Kadish also represented Sydney Ashkenazie who alleged to have found a painting, once credited to Rembrandt, stolen by the Nazis during World War II. Ashkenazie had hoped the painting would be valued at US$200 million. Ashkenazie states it was also Kadish who brought attorney F. Lee Bailey into the case. Kadish has been a frequent legal commentator on such high-profile criminal cases as the O. J. Simpson murder case and on the Atlanta Gold Club organized crime case.
