= Kidosht =

Kidosht كيدشت
- Village
- Location within Iran
- Coordinates: 32°18′14″N 59°42′40″E
- Country: Iran
- Province: South Khorasan
- County: Sarbisheh
- Bakhsh: Central
- Rural District: Momenabad

Population (2006)
  - Total: 56
- Time zone: UTC+3:30 (IRST)
  - Summer (DST): UTC+4:30 (IRDT)

Kidosht (Persian: كيدشت, also Romanized as Kīdosht, Kaidasht, and Keydasht; also known as Kadāsh) is a village in Momenabad Rural District, in the Central District of Sarbisheh County, South Khorasan Province, Iran. At the 2006 census, its population was 56, in 15 families.
