= Ecosse =

Écosse is the French-language word for Scotland.

Ecosse may refer to:

- Air Ecosse, a defunct Scottish commuter airline
- Ascari Ecosse, a British sports car
- Ecosse Films, a British film and television production company
- Ecurie Ecosse, a Scottish motor racing team
