= Kadesh (biblical) =

Placename in the Hebrew Bible

Coordinates: 30°38′33″N 34°24′49″E

Kadesh or Qadesh or Cades (Biblical Hebrew: קָדֵשׁ, from the root קדש "holy") is a place-name that occurs several times in the Hebrew Bible, describing a site or sites located south of, or at the southern border of, Canaan and the Kingdom of Judah. Many modern academics hold that it was a single site, located at the modern Tel el-Qudeirat, while some academics and rabbinical authorities hold that there were two locations named Kadesh. A related term, either synonymous with Kadesh or referring to one of the two sites, is Kadesh (or Qadesh) Barnea. Various etymologies for Barnea have been proposed, including 'desert of wanderings,' but none have produced widespread agreement.

The Bible mentions Kadesh and/or Kadesh Barnea in a number of episodes, making it an important site (or sites) in narratives concerning Israelite origins. Kadesh was the chief site of encampment for the Israelites during their wandering in the Zin Desert (Deuteronomy 1:46), as well as the place from which the Israelite spies were sent to Canaan (Numbers 13:1–26). The first failed attempt to capture Canaan was made from Kadesh (Numbers 14:40–45). Moses struck a rock (rather than speaking to it as the Lord commanded) that brought forth water at Kadesh (Numbers 20:11). Miriam (Numbers 20:1) and Aaron (Numbers 20:22–29) both died and were buried near a place named Kadesh. Moses sent envoys to the King of Edom from Kadesh (Numbers 20:14), asking for permission to let the Israelites use the King's Highway passing through his territory, which the Edomite king denied.

Kadesh Barnea is a key feature in the common biblical formula delineating the southern border of the Land of Israel (cf. Numbers 34:4, Joshua 15:3, Ezekiel 47:19 etc.) and thus its identification is key to understanding both the ideal and geopolitically realised borders of ancient Israel.

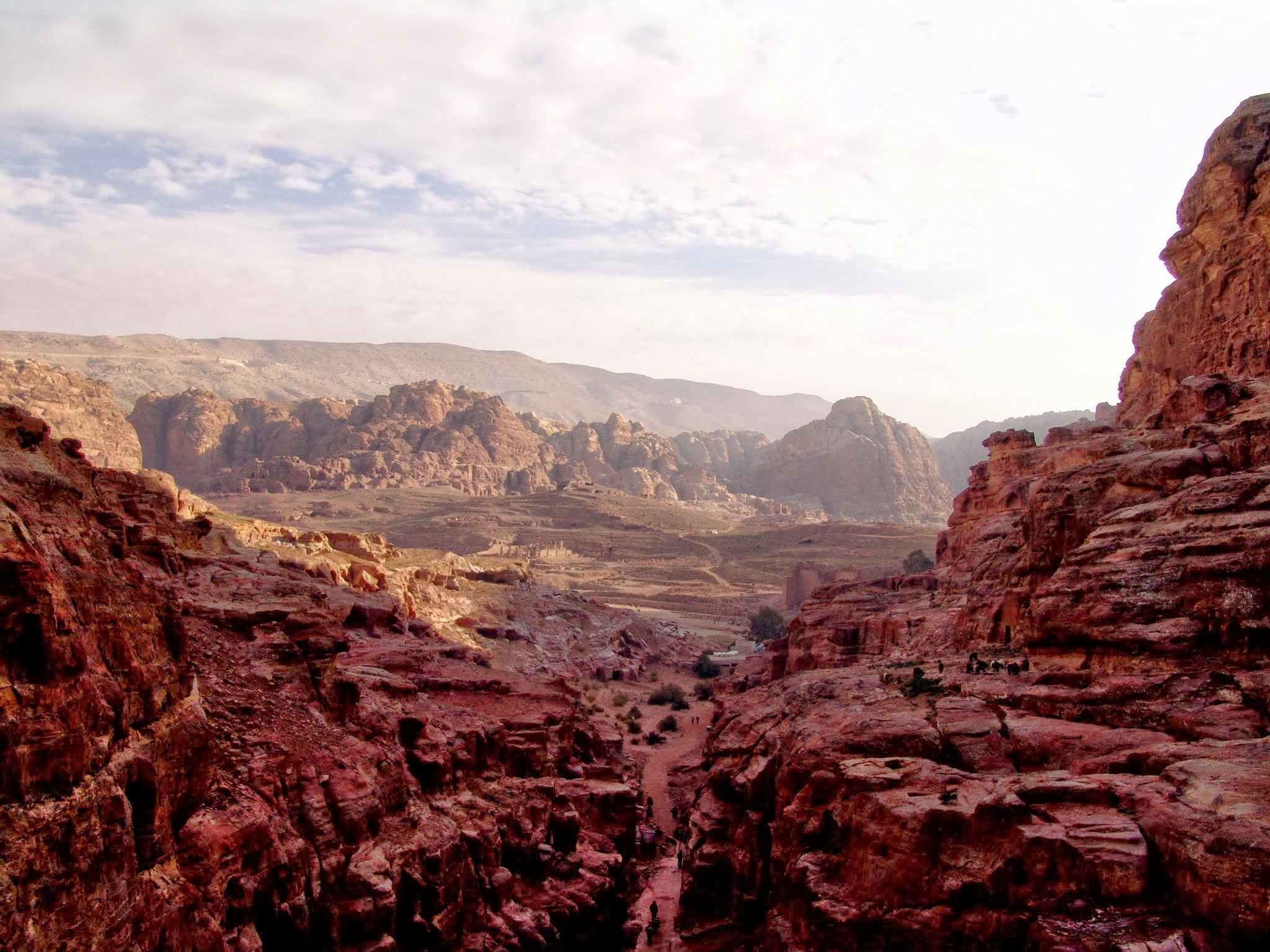
Petra, sometimes identified as an eastern Kadesh

== Biblical references ==
- Genesis 14:7: "And they [King Chedorlaomer and his allies] turned back, and came to En-mishpat--the same is Kadesh--and smote all the country of the Amalekites, and also the Amorites, that dwelt in Hazazon-tamar."
- Genesis 16:14: "Wherefore the well was called 'Beer-lahai-roi; behold, it is between Kadesh and Bered."
- Genesis 20:1: "And Abraham journeyed from thence toward the land of the South, and dwelt between Kadesh and Shur; and he sojourned in Gerar."
- Numbers 13:26: "And they went and came to Moses, and to Aaron, and to all the congregation of the children of Israel, unto the wilderness of Paran, to Kadesh; and brought back word unto them, and unto all the congregation, and showed them the fruit of the land."
- Numbers 20:1: "And the children of Israel, even the whole congregation, came into the wilderness of Zin in the first month; and the people abode in Kadesh; and Miriam died there, and was buried there."
- Numbers 20:14–16: "And Moses sent messengers from Kadesh unto the king of Edom: 'Thus saith thy brother Israel: Thou knowest all the travail that hath befallen us; how our fathers went down into Egypt, and we dwelt in Egypt a long time; and the Egyptians dealt ill with us, and our fathers; and when we cried unto the LORD, He heard our voice, and sent a messenger, and brought us forth out of Egypt; and, behold, we are in Kadesh, a city in the uttermost of thy border."
- Numbers 20:22: "And they journeyed from Kadesh; and the children of Israel, even the whole congregation, came unto mount Hor."
- Numbers 27:13–14: "And when thou hast seen it, thou also shalt be gathered unto thy people, as Aaron thy brother was gathered; because ye rebelled against My commandment in the wilderness of Zin, in the strife of the congregation, to sanctify Me at the waters before their eyes.'--These are the waters of Meribath-kadesh in the wilderness of Zin."
- Numbers 33:36–37: "And they journeyed from Ezion-geber, and pitched in the wilderness of Zin--the same is Kadesh. And they journeyed from Kadesh, and pitched in mount Hor, in the edge of the land of Edom."
- Deuteronomy 1:46: "So ye abode in Kadesh many days, according unto the days that ye abode there."
- Deuteronomy 32:51: "Because ye trespassed against Me in the midst of the children of Israel at the waters of Meribath-kadesh, in the wilderness of Zin; because ye sanctified Me not in the midst of the children of Israel."
- Judges 11:16–17: "But when they came up from Egypt, and Israel walked through the wilderness unto the Red Sea, and came to Kadesh; then Israel sent messengers unto the king of Edom, saying: Let me, I pray thee, pass through thy land; but the king of Edom hearkened not. And in like manner he sent unto the king of Moab; but he would not; and Israel abode in Kadesh."
- Psalm 29:8: "The voice of the LORD shaketh the wilderness; the LORD shaketh the wilderness of Kadesh."
- Ezekiel 47:19: "And the south side southward shall be from Tamar as far as the waters of Meriboth-kadesh, to the Brook, unto the Great Sea. This is the south side southward."
- Ezekiel 48:28: "And by the border of Gad, at the south side southward, the border shall be even from Tamar unto the waters of Meribath-kadesh, to the Brook, unto the Great Sea."

== Location ==
The most common identification of Kadesh or Kadesh Barnea in modern scholarship is with the present-day Tell el-Qudeirat, with most contemporary scholars seeing the biblical references to Kadesh as referring to a single site.

The Bible locates Kadesh, or Kadesh Barnea, as an oasis south of Canaan, west of the Aravah and east of the Brook of Egypt. It is 11 days' march by way of Mount Seir from Horeb (Deuteronomy 1:2).

By the late nineteenth century, as many as eighteen sites had been proposed for biblical Kadesh. One source of confusion has been the fact that Kadesh is sometimes mentioned in connection with the Desert of Paran (Numbers 13:26) and at other times with the Zin Desert (Numbers 20:1). This discrepancy has been noted by commentators as early as the Middle Ages. Some (e.g., Hezekiah ben Manoah) sought a reconciliatory model, while others (Abraham ibn Ezra and Nahmanides) proposed two separate sites named Kadesh.

A minority of recent scholars have maintained a two-site theory, with a western Kadesh in the wilderness of Zin and an eastern one in the wilderness of Paran, the latter often associated with Petra in Jordan. The two-site theory also appears to have been held by Josephus and Eusebius of Caesarea. Josephus identifies Miriam's burial site (which the Bible identifies as Kadesh) with Petra, which he called Rekem (Nabataean Aramaic 𐢛𐢚𐢓𐢈, *Raqēmō).

After a period in which researchers identified Kadesh with the similarly named Ein Qedeis, since 1905, Ain el-Qudeirat in the North Sinai Governorate of Egypt has been widely accepted as the location of Kadesh Barnea. Several Iron Age fortresses have been excavated there. The oldest, a small elliptical structure, dates to the 10th century BCE, and was abandoned for some time after its first destruction. A second fort, constructed during the eighth century BCE (probably during the reign of Uzziah) was destroyed during the seventh century BCE, most likely during Manasseh of Judah's reign. Two ostraca engraved in Hebrew, dated to the 8th or 7th century BCE, have been recovered there, suggesting Israelite occupation.

== Archaeological exploration ==
The Ain el-Qudeirat oasis in Wadi el-Ain of northern Sinai was first archaeologically investigated in 1914 by two British researchers, Leonard Woolley and T. E. Lawrence ("Lawrence of Arabia") as part of their regional survey on behalf of the Palestine Exploration Fund. At the top of the Ain el-Qudeirat site they identified a fortress—built in the last decades of the 8th century BCE and destroyed around 600 BCE—and they cut a sounding into one of its rooms. During Israel's short occupation of the Sinai in 1956, Moshe Dothan of the Israel Department of Antiquities and Museums (IDAM), dug additional soundings in the fortress.

During the Israeli occupation of the Sinai following the 1967 Six-Day War, Rudolph Cohen of the IDAM directed the first large-scale excavations, which took place in 1976–1982 and were fully published after Cohen's death. Among the earliest finds were local pottery sherds dated, as of 2015, to the end of the Late Bronze Age (early 12th century BCE) and the Early Iron I period (end of the 12th and the 11th century BCE), as well as four Egyptian-style items—two seals and two seal impressions—from later strata, probably also older than the 10th-century BCE fortress.

According to a 2010 article, the excavations uncovered copious remains of the Middle Bronze Age I period (MBA I or MBI, sometimes known as the Intermediate Bronze Age, IBA), which were also found at numerous other sites in the Negev. On the other hand, Late Bronze Age, the conventional time of the Exodus, was unattested in the Negev and at the Ain el-Qudeirat site, although more recent reevaluations of Cohen's findings at Ain el-Qudeirat indicate that the site was probably occupied from at least the 12th century BCE.

In 1983, Cohen suggested that the MBI people should be identified as "proto-Israelites" based on migratory patterns and cultural discontinuity although there is evidence that they retained the earlier cultural customs of the southern Levant. Others archaeologists suggest they were Amorites and Kurgans, who arrived from the north and east.

Cohen wrapped up his excavation campaign in 1982, shortly before Israel's withdrawal from the Sinai as part of the peace agreement with Egypt. All field research at the ancient tell (mound) ceased at that point and as of 2015, has not been resumed since.

== See also ==
- Nitzanei Sinai, also known as Kadesh Barnea, a community settlement in the Negev desert of modern-day Israel
