= Jaririya =

Sufi order

Jaririya is a Sufi order, one of the largest Sufi orders in North Sinai. The Jaririya order is named for its founder, Sheikh Eid Abu Jarir, who was a member of the Sawarka tribe and the Jarira clan, and established the order in Sinai in the 1940s. The Jarira clan resides in the vicinity of Bir al-Abed.

It has 130 affiliated mosques in Egypt today.

In reaction to the Sinai Province group's threats, the Jaririya order had decided to rebuild its maqam shrines without domes.

The Jaririya order is lineally descended from the Alawi-Ahmadi, Alawiyya, Darqawa, and Shadhili branches.

== See also ==
- 2017 Sinai mosque attack
