= Qades =

- Location in Afghanistan
- Coordinates: 34°48′N 63°25′E
- Country: Afghanistan
- Province: Badghis Province
- Time zone: + 4.30

Qades is a village in Badghis Province in north western Afghanistan.
