= Sheikh Zuweid =

Sheikh Zuweid الشيخ زويد ⲃⲁⲓⲧⲩⲗⲟⲩⲁ
- City
- Location in Egypt Sheikh Zuweid (Egypt)
- Coordinates: 31°12′43″N 34°6′38″E
- Country: Egypt
- Governorate: North Sinai

Area
  - Total: 640.9 km^{2} (247.5 sq mi)
- Elevation: 88 m (289 ft)

Population (2021)
  - Total: 64,305
- Time zone: UTC+2 (EET)
  - Summer (DST): UTC+3 (EEST)

Sheikh Zuweid (also spelled Sheikh Zoweid, Shaykh Zuwayd, or Sheikh Zouède; Arabic: الشيخ زويد Arabic pronunciation: [aʃˈʃeːx zeˈweːd, -zoˈwæjjed], Coptic: ⲃⲁⲓⲧⲩⲗⲟⲩⲁ, Greek: Bitulion) is a Bedouin town in the North Sinai Governorate of Egypt near the border with the Gaza Strip. It is situated between the cities of Arish and Rafah and is 334 kilometers (214 miles) northeast of Cairo. It had a population of around 60,000 as of 2015.

== History ==
A remarkable mosaic from Late Antiquity (between the mid-fourth and mid-fifth centuries) was found in Sheikh Zuweid in 1913, known from the archaeological literature as the Sheikh Zouède mosaic (leaning on the French spelling: Cheikh Zouède). It is currently preserved in a museum in Ismailia. The 6th century Madaba Map shows a settlement called Betulion (Greek Β[ητ]υλιον) in this location, possibly the Bethulia where Judith beheaded Holofernes in biblical legend.

The town is named after Sheikh Zuweid, a commander of the Rashidun Islamic army who fought during the Muslim conquest of Egypt alongside Amr ibn al-'As. He died at the site of the present town in 640.

During the 2011 Egyptian revolution, protests against the government of Hosni Mubarak were held in Sheikh Zuweid. On 27 January, one protester was killed by security forces attempting to disperse the demonstrations. On 14 May 2011, an unknown group bombed the Sufi shrine in Sheikh Zuweid. As many as 300 ISIS affiliated militants using mortars and car bombs attacked fifteen Army checkpoints just north of the city on July 1, 2015. The attacks killed 30 Egyptian soldiers and were part of a larger group of coordinated attacks across the Sinai.

== Climate ==
Köppen-Geiger climate classification system classifies its climate as hot desert (BWh), as the rest of Egypt, but because it is close to the sea, its climate is highly moderated by prevailing Mediterranean Sea winds, typical to the north coast of Egypt and the east Mediterranean coast.

Climate data for Sheikh Zuweid
| Month | Jan | Feb | Mar | Apr | May | Jun | Jul | Aug | Sep | Oct | Nov | Dec | Year |
|---|---|---|---|---|---|---|---|---|---|---|---|---|---|
| Mean daily maximum °C (°F) | 17.2 (63.0) | 18.0 (64.4) | 20.5 (68.9) | 23.1 (73.6) | 26.1 (79.0) | 28.4 (83.1) | 29.8 (85.6) | 30.7 (87.3) | 29.2 (84.6) | 27.6 (81.7) | 23.7 (74.7) | 19.2 (66.6) | 24.5 (76.0) |
| Daily mean °C (°F) | 12.7 (54.9) | 13.4 (56.1) | 15.6 (60.1) | 18.2 (64.8) | 21.1 (70.0) | 23.7 (74.7) | 25.3 (77.5) | 26.1 (79.0) | 24.7 (76.5) | 22.6 (72.7) | 18.7 (65.7) | 14.5 (58.1) | 19.7 (67.5) |
| Mean daily minimum °C (°F) | 8.2 (46.8) | 8.9 (48.0) | 10.7 (51.3) | 13.3 (55.9) | 16.1 (61.0) | 19.0 (66.2) | 20.9 (69.6) | 21.6 (70.9) | 20.3 (68.5) | 17.7 (63.9) | 13.7 (56.7) | 9.9 (49.8) | 15.0 (59.0) |
| Average precipitation mm (inches) | 37 (1.5) | 29 (1.1) | 22 (0.9) | 6 (0.2) | 3 (0.1) | 0 (0) | 0 (0) | 0 (0) | 0 (0) | 7 (0.3) | 31 (1.2) | 40 (1.6) | 175 (6.9) |
Source: Climate-Data.org (altitude: 30m)

== Notable people ==
- Ibrahim al-Arjani

== See also ==
- Sinai
- Northern coast of Egypt
