= Bir al-Abd =

Bir al-Abed بئر العبد
- City
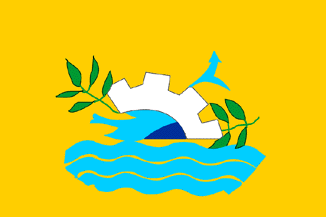
- Flag

- Location in Egypt
- Coordinates: 31.018056°N 33.011111°E
- Country: Egypt
- Governorate: North Sinai

Population (2015)
  - Total: ~87,219
- Time zone: UTC+2 (EET)
  - Summer (DST): UTC+3 (EEST)

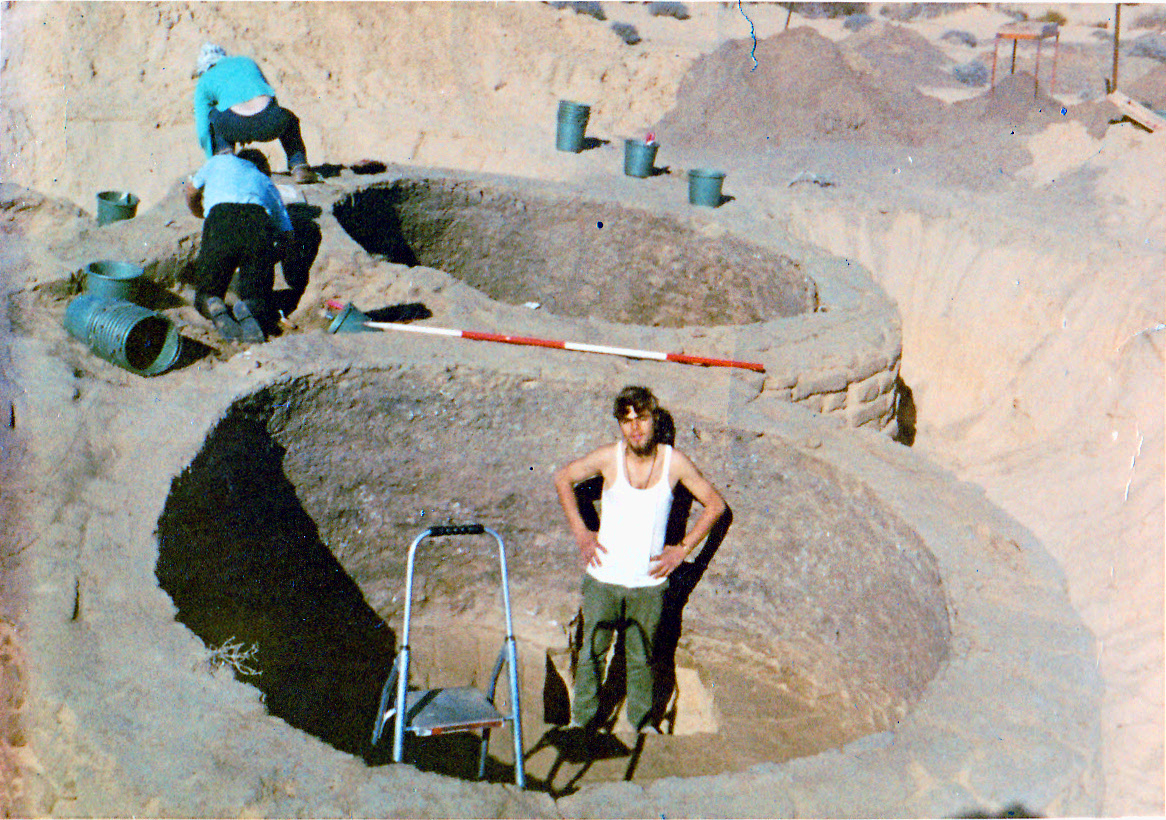
1974 excavation in Bir al-Abed: an ancient silo

Bir al-Abed (Arabic: بئر العبد, romanized: biʾr al-ʿabd; Egyptian Arabic: بير العبد) is one of the cities of North Sinai in the north east of Egypt. It is the capital of Bir al-Abd Markaz, located on the international coastal road on the shores of Lake Bardawil.

== History ==
On 9 August 1916, the Battle of Bir el Abd, which was part of the Sinai and Palestine Campaign of the First World War, occurred. Following the British success in the battle of Romani, ANZAC Mounted Division, with the 5th Mounted Brigade under command, was tasked to follow a retiring Turkish Army force. British patrols discovered them on 8 August and the remainder of the ANZAC Division got into a position to attack the next day. The assault was launched on early 9 August and became a day of attack and counter-attack. Finally in the early evening Chauvel, commanding the ANZAC Division, ordered his troops to withdraw leaving the Turkish force in command of the battleground.

On 24 November 2017, in the al-Rawda mosque near the town, known as the birthplace of the founder of Sufism in the Sinai Peninsula, was attacked by around forty gunmen during Friday prayers. The gun and bomb attack killed at least 305 people and injured more than 100 others, making it the deadliest attack in Egyptian history. The mosque is on the road between El Arish and Bir al-Abed.

On 12 October 2019, a blast killed nine members from the same family when they were returning from an olive farm and wounded the other six during the battle against the insurgency in the area.

== See also ==
- Northern coast of Egypt
- Sheikh Zuweid
- Gaza Strip
