= 2017 Sinai mosque attack =

Terrorist bombing in a Sinai mosque, Egypt

Al-Rawda mosque attack
- Part of the Sinai insurgency and Terrorism in Egypt
- Location: 31°2′22″N 33°20′52″E; Al-Rawda, Bir al-Abed, North Sinai Governorate, Egypt
- Date: 24 November 2017; 8 years ago 1:50 PM EET (UTC+2)
- Target: al-Rawda mosque
- Attack type: Bombing, mass shooting
- Weapons: IEDs, rocket-propelled grenades and firearms
- Deaths: 311
- Injuries: at least 128
- Perpetrator: Islamic State
- Motive: Anti-Sufism

At 1:50 PM EET on 24 November 2017, the al-Rawda mosque was attacked by roughly 40 ISIL gunmen during Friday prayers. The mosque is located in the village of Al-Rawda east of the town of Bir al-Abed in Egypt's North Sinai Governorate. It is one of the main mosques associated with the Jaririya Sufi order, one of the largest Sufi orders in North Sinai. The Jaririya order is named for its founder, Sheikh Eid Abu Jarir, who was a member of the Sawarka tribe and the Jarira clan. The Jarira clan resides in the vicinity of Bir al-Abed. The attack killed 311 people and injured at least 128, making it the deadliest attack in Egyptian history. It was the second-deadliest terrorist attack of 2017, after the Mogadishu bombings on 14 October. The attack was universally condemned by world leaders and organizations.

== Background ==
Al-Rawda Mosque, which is located on Sinai's main coastal highway connecting the city of Port Said to Gaza, belongs to the local Jarir clan, of the Sawarka tribe, who follow the Jaririya (Gaririya) Sufi order—an offshoot of the movement of Abu Ahmed al-Ghazawi, of the broader Darqawa order. The mosque is on the road between El Arish and Bir al-Abed. The mosque has a smaller zawiyah, a Sufi lodge, attached.

== Attack ==
According to local media, attackers in four off-road vehicles planted three bombs; the attackers used the burning wrecks of cars to block off escape routes. After their detonation, they launched rocket propelled grenades and opened fire on worshippers during the crowded Friday prayer at al-Rawda near Bir al-Abed. When ambulances arrived to transport the wounded to hospitals, the attackers opened fire on them as well, having selected ambush points from which to target them. Local residents quickly responded, bringing the wounded to hospitals in their own cars and trucks, and even taking up weapons to fight back.

=== Casualties ===
311 people were killed in the attack, including 27 children, and at least 128 other people were wounded. Many of the victims worked at a nearby salt factory and were at the mosque for Friday prayers.

== Responsibility ==
No group claimed responsibility for the attack, although there were reports that the attack appeared to be the work of Islamic State's Wilayat Sinai branch. On 25 November, the Egyptian public prosecutor's office, citing interviews with survivors, said the attackers brandished the Islamic State flag.

Islamist militants have been active in the Sinai since July 2013, killing at least 1,000 Egyptian security forces personnel. According to The New York Times, in January 2017 an interview of an insurgent commander in Sinai appeared in issue five of the Islamic State magazine Rumiyah, where the commander condemned Sufi practices and identified the district where the attack occurred as one of three areas where Sufis live in Sinai that Islamic State intended to "eradicate." The community had been repeatedly threatened to refrain from Sufi practices.

Jund al-Islam, an al-Qaeda-linked jihadist group in Sinai who were formerly affiliated with ISIL, declared their innocence and condemned the attack on the al-Rawda mosque.

== Reactions ==
Egypt declared three days of national mourning following the attack. Egyptian President Abdel Fattah el-Sisi said the attack "shall not go unpunished". The President also ordered the government to allocate funds for compensating families of the dead.

The Muslim Brotherhood wrote on Twitter and Facebook that it "condemns in the strongest words" the attack and that those responsible should "renounce extremism and violence". Al-Azhar University, Egypt's oldest accredited university, issued a statement condemning the attacks, adding "terrorism will be routed".

One week after the attack, Grand Imam of al-Azhar Ahmed el-Tayeb, along with Grand Mufti Shawki Allam and Religious Endowments Minister Mokhtar Gomaa, performed Friday prayers at al-Rawda mosque.

The attack was widely condemned by the international community, with many world leaders issuing official statements and social media posts. Turkey declared one day of national mourning on 27 November.

The Supreme Council for Sufi Orders cancelled street celebrations of Mawlid throughout Egypt as a sign of mourning.

The Egyptian Organization for Human Rights strongly condemned the attacks, and weeks later issued a report that considered the massacre an attempt of genocide against the Sufi Muslim community of the Sinai Peninsula. EOHR also called upon the Egyptian government to provide adequate protection for minorities.

A three-day opening of the border crossing into Gaza from Rafah, Egypt, scheduled for 25–27 November, was cancelled due to security concerns. The Cairo International Film Festival stated in a press release its intention to continue with the festival, and condemned the attacks.

The Tel Aviv-Yafo Municipality building, the Library of Birmingham, the Kuwait Towers and the CN Tower were illuminated with the colors of the Egyptian flag as a sign of solidarity. The lights of the Eiffel Tower were extinguished as well. The Royal Hashemite Court flew the Jordanian flag at half-mast.

=== Military response ===
President el-Sisi vowed to respond with "the utmost force". In the days immediately after the attack, the Air Force announced that it had pursued and destroyed some of the militants' vehicles and weapons stocks. Airstrikes were also conducted in the neighboring mountains.

In February 2018, Egypt responded to this attack with major air strikes and land assaults against terrorist positions in Sinai.

== See also ==
- October 2016 Sinai attacks
- List of major terrorist incidents
- List of terrorist incidents in November 2017
- Persecution of Sufis
