= Rafah, Egypt =

Rafah رفح
- City
- Location in Egypt
- Coordinates: 31°17′19″N 34°14′28″E
- Country: Egypt
- Governorate: North Sinai

Area
  - Total: 176.4 sq mi (456.9 km^{2})

Population (2021)
  - Total: 80,823
  - Density: 458.2/sq mi (176.9/km^{2})
  - Ethnicities: Bedouin Arabs and Egyptians
- Time zone: UTC+2 (EET)
  - Summer (DST): UTC+3 (EEST)

Rafah (Arabic: رفح, IPA: [ˈɾɑfɑħ]) is a city in North Sinai and Egypt's eastern border with the Gaza Strip, Palestine. It is the capital of Rafah center in North Sinai Governorate, and is situated on the eastern Mediterranean coast of Egypt.

Rafah is the site of the Rafah Border Crossing, the sole crossing point between Egypt and the Gaza Strip. Following the 2013 military coup, the new Egyptian government announced in early 2015 that it would raze the entire city and build a new settlement for its residents, in order to expand a security buffer between Egypt and the Gaza Strip. The Egyptian military began bulldozing sections of Rafah in late 2014. By 2021, the Egyptian military had demolished at least 7,460 buildings in Rafah.

== History ==
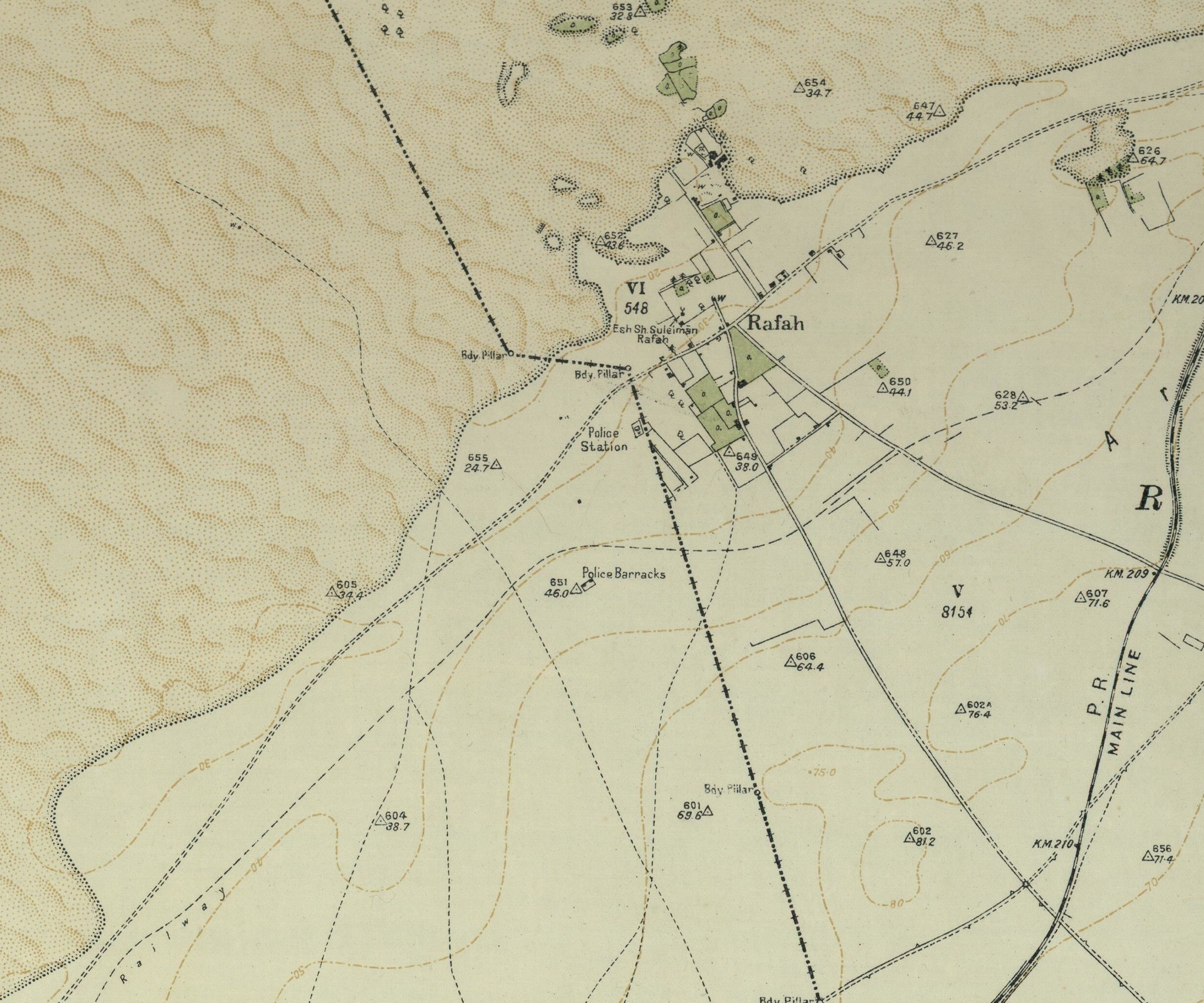
This 1931 Survey of Palestine map shows the town of Rafah, near Gaza. A police station and police barracks is shown on the Egyptian side of the border.

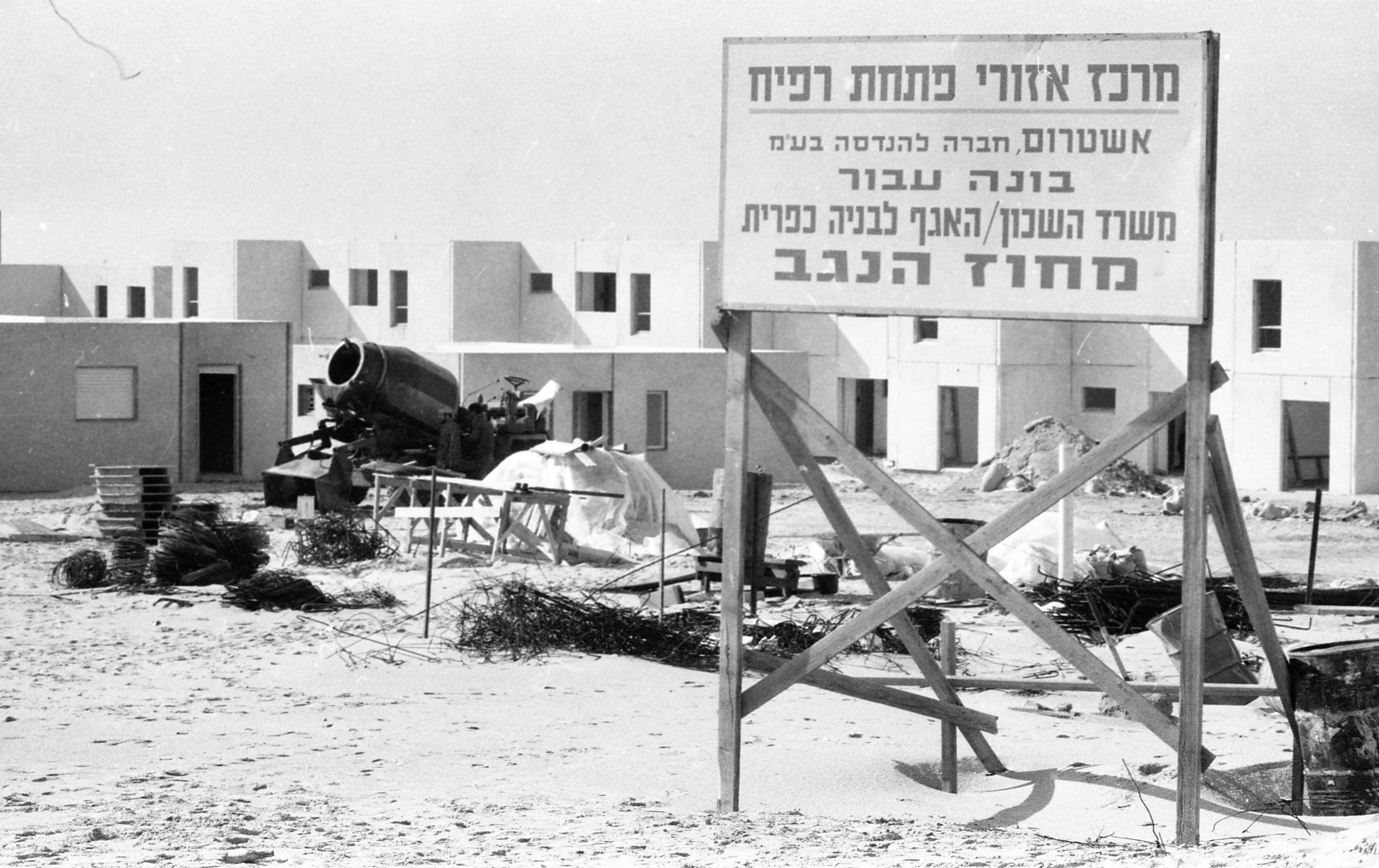
Constructions of Israeli houses in Rafah, occupied Sinai, 1975

When Israel withdrew from the Sinai in 1982, Rafah was split into a Gazan part and an Egyptian part, dividing families, separated by barbed-wire barriers. The core of the city was destroyed by Israel and Egypt to create a large buffer zone.

During the 2011 Egyptian protests, anti-government rioters attacked and killed three police officers in the town.

In October 2014, the Egyptian government announced plans to relocate the population and completely demolish the city in order to enlarge the buffer zone between Egypt and Gaza. Between July 2013 and August 2015, Egyptian authorities demolished at least 3,255 residential, commercial, administrative, and community buildings along the border, forcibly evicting thousands of people.

In June 2015 Egypt completed the digging of a ditch at the Rafah Crossing Point, 20 meters wide by 10 meters deep. It is located two kilometers from the border with Gaza outside of Rafah City and part of the enlarged buffer zone. Expansion of the trench along with watchtowers was planned. In November 2021, Egypt and Israel signed an agreement that allows Egypt to increase its military presence in Rafah.

By mid-2018, the Egyptian military had destroyed at least 6,850 buildings in the city of Rafah, and from August 2016 to August 2019, the Egyptian army destroyed and closed 3,500 hectares of farmland. Subsequently, the number of buildings destroyed by the Egyptians rose to 7,460. Human Rights Watch stated that these demolitions are likely war crimes.

== Economy ==
Rafah is in a Mediterranean climate zone and agriculture thrives. Due to rain, hail and sleet; the city has plentiful sources of water for agriculture. Mediterranean fruits and crops are dominant, such as: peaches, olives, apples, citrus fruits, dates, grapes, vegetables, strawberries and peppers.

Smuggling to the Gaza Strip has been a major source of income for Bedouin tribesmen, using over 1,200 smuggling tunnels to smuggle food, weapons and other goods into Gaza.

== Climate ==
Like east Mediterranean cities and Egypt's north coast but wetter, it is characterised by hot dry summers and mild rainy winters. The temperature during summer can be around 30 °C (86 °F) during daytime, and rarely exceeds 35 °C (95 °F) due to the influence of the sea. Winters range from mild to cool during the day and chilly during the night and temperatures dip below 6 °C (43 °F) very often. Rainfall is average with sometimes hail, sleet and rarely snow takes place.

Köppen-Geiger climate classification system classifies its climate as hot semi-arid (BSh).

Rafah, Alexandria, Abu Qir, Rosetta, Baltim, Kafr el-Dawwar and Mersa Matruh are the wettest places in Egypt.

Climate data for Rafah, North Sinai
Month	Jan	Feb	Mar	Apr	May	Jun	Jul	Aug	Sep	Oct	Nov	Dec	Year
Mean daily maximum °C (°F)	17.2 (63.0)	18.0 (64.4)	20.3 (68.5)	22.9 (73.2)	25.8 (78.4)	28.2 (82.8)	29.6 (85.3)	30.5 (86.9)	29.0 (84.2)	27.4 (81.3)	23.7 (74.7)	19.3 (66.7)	24.3 (75.8)
Daily mean °C (°F)	12.7 (54.9)	13.5 (56.3)	15.4 (59.7)	18.0 (64.4)	20.8 (69.4)	23.5 (74.3)	25.2 (77.4)	25.9 (78.6)	24.5 (76.1)	22.4 (72.3)	18.6 (65.5)	14.7 (58.5)	19.6 (67.3)
Mean daily minimum °C (°F)	8.2 (46.8)	9.0 (48.2)	10.6 (51.1)	13.2 (55.8)	15.9 (60.6)	18.8 (65.8)	20.8 (69.4)	21.4 (70.5)	20.0 (68.0)	17.4 (63.3)	13.5 (56.3)	10.1 (50.2)	14.9 (58.8)
Average precipitation mm (inches)	49 (1.9)	37 (1.5)	28 (1.1)	6 (0.2)	4 (0.2)	1 (0.0)	0 (0)	0 (0)	0 (0)	8 (0.3)	39 (1.5)	54 (2.1)	226 (8.8)
Source: Climate-Data.org (altitude: 78m)

== See also ==
- List of cities and towns in Egypt
- Rafah
- Rafah Border Crossing
- Gaza Strip smuggling tunnels
