= North Sinai Governorate =

Governorate of Egypt

- Governorate
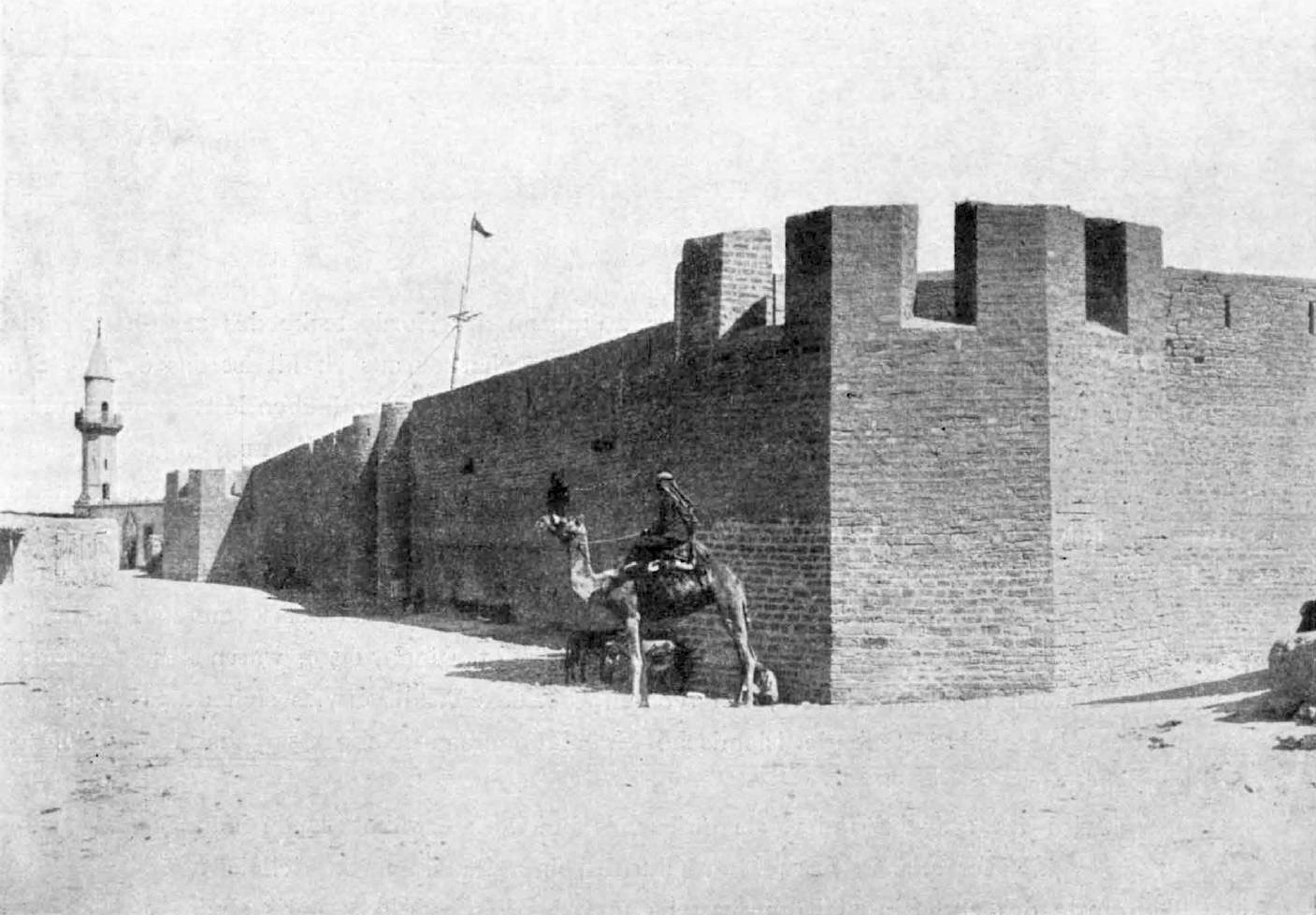
- Arish fort, 1916

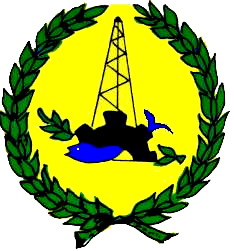
- Flag

- North Sinai Governorate in Egypt
- Coordinates: 30.5°N 33.6°E
- Country: Egypt
- Seat: Arish (capital)

Government
  - Governor: Khaled Mohamed

Area
  - Total: 27,574 km^{2} (10,646 sq mi)

Population (January 2024)
  - Total: 450,531
  - Density: 16.339/km^{2} (42.318/sq mi)

GDP
  - Total: EGP 49 billion (US$ 3.1 billion)
- Time zone: UTC+2 (EGY)
  - Summer (DST): UTC+3 (EEST)
- HDI (2021): 0.738 high · 10th
- Website: www.northsinai.gov.eg

North Sinai (Arabic: محافظة شمال سيناء Muḥāfẓet Shamāl Sīnāʾ) is one of the governorates of Egypt. It is located in the north-eastern part of the country, and encompasses the northern half of the Sinai Peninsula. It is bordered in the north by the Mediterranean Sea, in the south by South Sinai Governorate, in the west by Port Said, Ismailia, and Suez Governorates, and in the east by the Gaza Strip in Palestine (Rafah Governorate) and Israel (Southern District). Its capital is the city of El Arish. A governorate is administered by a governor, who is appointed by the President of Egypt and serves at the president's discretion.

North Sinai has a rich history dating back to ancient times and is home to several ancient settlements that hold significant historical and Biblical importance – Ostrakine and Kasion, both of which served as a border city between Egypt and Syria and an important bishopric in the Byzantine era; Kadesh Barnea, an important site, with its history tied to the events described in the Bible.

The population of the North Sinai Governorate as at 2015 was 434,781 people, comprising predominantly Bedouin tribesmen. The Governorate covers an area of 27,574 square kilometers. The population density is 15 inhabitants per square kilometer.

North Sinai was especially affected by the Sinai insurgency and measures by government forces to combat it, which has resulted in many casualties. On October 14, 2016, twelve Egyptian troops were killed at a checkpoint near El Arish. On November 27, 2017, a mosque in the village of Al-Rawda was attacked by roughly 40 gunmen, killing at least 305 and injuring up to 128 others, making it the deadliest terror attack in Egyptian history.

== Archaeology ==
In August 2026, archaeologists excavating the ancient settlement of Asila uncovered the remains of a roadside caravanserai believed to have served commercial caravans, Egyptian pilgrims, and other travellers using the Sultan’s Road, also known as the Egyptian Pilgrims’ Road. The structure contains mudbrick and red-brick walls reinforced with limestone foundations, several rooms, and possible shops, while associated finds include large pottery vessels used for storing water and provisions, olive-green glazed pottery, red-and-white pottery, and fragments of lamps. The artifacts suggest a Mamluk-period date, although further analysis is required for precise dating. The discovery adds evidence for the network of stations that supported pilgrimage, trade, communication, and travel between Egypt, the Levant, and the Arabian Peninsula.

== Municipal divisions ==
The governorate is divided into municipal divisions for administrative purposes with a total estimated population as of January 2023 of 504,201.

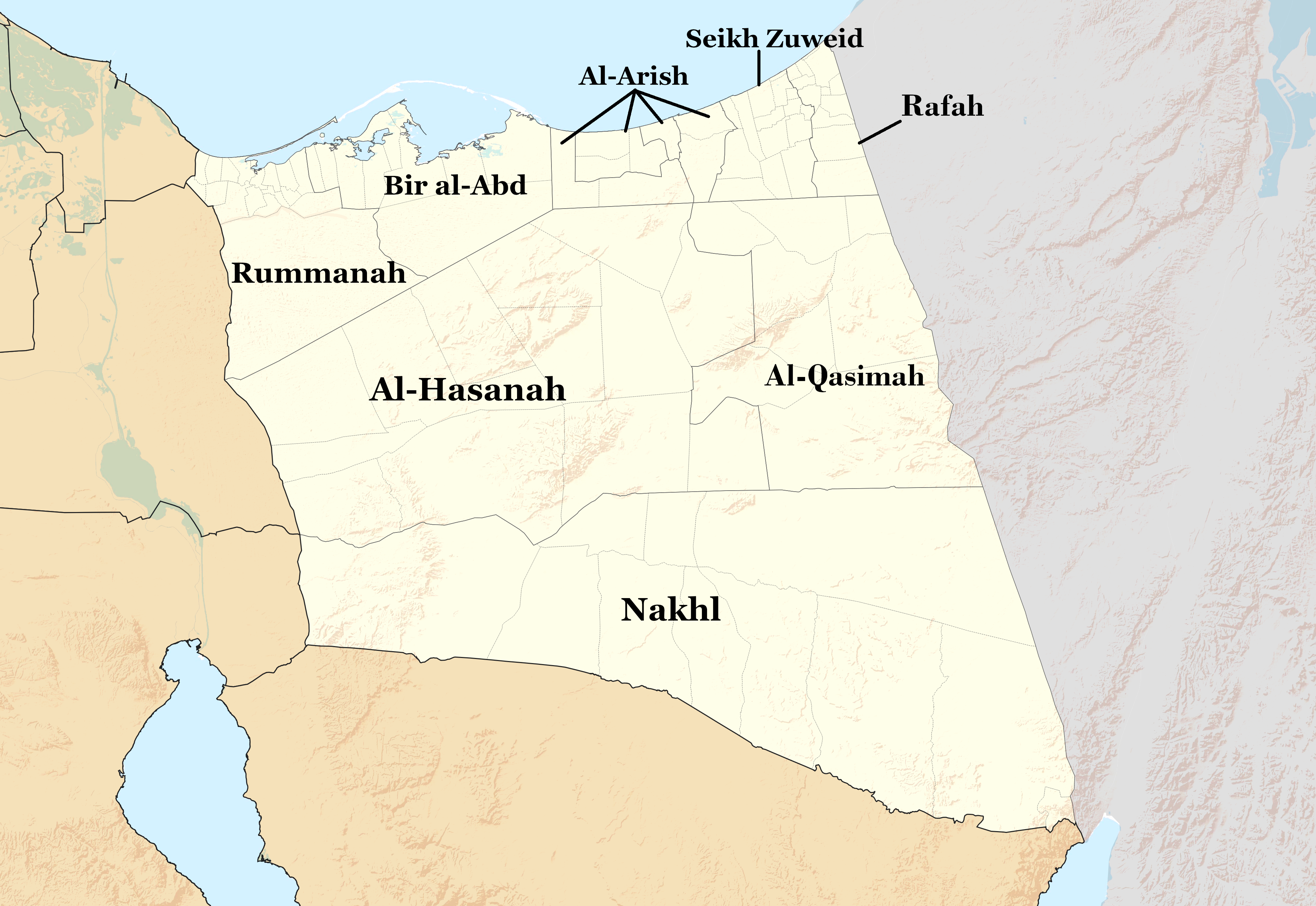
Subdivisions of the Governorate

Municipal Divisions
Anglicized name	Native name	Arabic transliteration	Population (January 2023 Est.)	Type
El Arish 1	قسم أول العريش	Al-'Arīsh 1	60,219	Kism (urban and rural parts)
El Arish 2	قسم ثان العريش	Al-'Arīsh 2	70,856	Kism (fully urban)
El Arish 3	قسم ثالث العريش	Al-'Arīsh 3	47,701	Kism (fully urban)
El Arish 4	قسم رابع العريش	Al-'Arīsh 4	29,343	Kism (urban and rural parts)
El Hassana	قسم الحسنة	Al-Ḥasanah	21,213	Kism (urban and rural parts)
Sheikh Zuweid	قسم الشيخ زويد	Ash-Shaykh Zuwayd	65,964	Kism (urban and rural parts)
Bir El Abd	قسم بئر العبد	B'īr al-'Abd	60,827	Kism (urban and rural parts)
Nakhl	قسم نخل	Nakhl	6,662	Kism (urban and rural parts)
Rafah	قسم رفح	Rafaḥ	82,793	Kism (urban and rural parts)
Shurtet El Qasima	قسم القسيمة	Al-Qasīmah	13,331	Kism (fully rural)
Shurtet Rumana	قسم رمانة	Rumānah	45,292	Kism (fully rural)

== Population ==
Historical population
Year	Pop.	±%
1937	18,011	—
1947	37,670	+109.1%
1957		—
1966	131,000	—
1976		—
1986	171,505	—
1996	252,160	+47.0%
2006	343,681	+36.3%
2015	434,781	+26.5%
2017	451,990	+4.0%
2018	457,000	+1.1%
2023	504,201	+10.3%

According to population estimates, in 2024 the majority of residents in the governorate lived in urban areas, with an urbanization rate of 60.2%. Out of an estimated total of 450,531 people, 261,219 people lived in urban areas and 179,312 lived in rural areas.

== Counties and cities ==
North Sinai is divided into six markaz (counties), each with an eponymous city as their capitals.

- Al-Arish, also the governorate's capital and largest city, with 164,830 inhabitants as of 2012.
- Nekhel
- Rafah
- Bir al-Abd
- Al-Hassana (see Raid on Bir el Hassana and the map included therein; "bir" means "a well")
- Sheikh Zuweid

== Industrial zones ==
According to the Governing Authority for Investment and Free Zones (GAFI), the following industrial zones are located in North Sinai:

Zone name
Be'r El Abd Industrial Zone
Massaeed Crafts Zone

== Governors ==
- Muhammad Abdul Mun'em El Qirmani (May 1974-November 1976)
- Fu'ad Ibrahim Nassar (November 1976-November 1978)
- Muhammad Hussein Shawkat (November 1978-May 1980)
- Youssef Sabri Abu Taleb (May 1980-August 1982)
- Mounir Ahmad Shash (September 1982-January 1996)
- Muhammad Dasouqi El Ghayati (January 1996-July 1997)
- Ali Hifzi Muhammad (July 1997-November 1999)
- Ahmad Abdul Hamid Muhammad (November 1999-April 2008)
- Abdel Fadil Shousha (April 2008-January 2010)
- Murad Muwafi (January 2010-January 2011)
- Sayyid Abdul Wahhab Mabrouk (30 January 2011 – 8 August 2012)
- Abdul Fattah Harhour (4 September 2012 – 30 August 2018)
- Abdel Fadil Shousha (second term) (August 2018-)
