= Typhon =

Deadly monster of Greek mythology

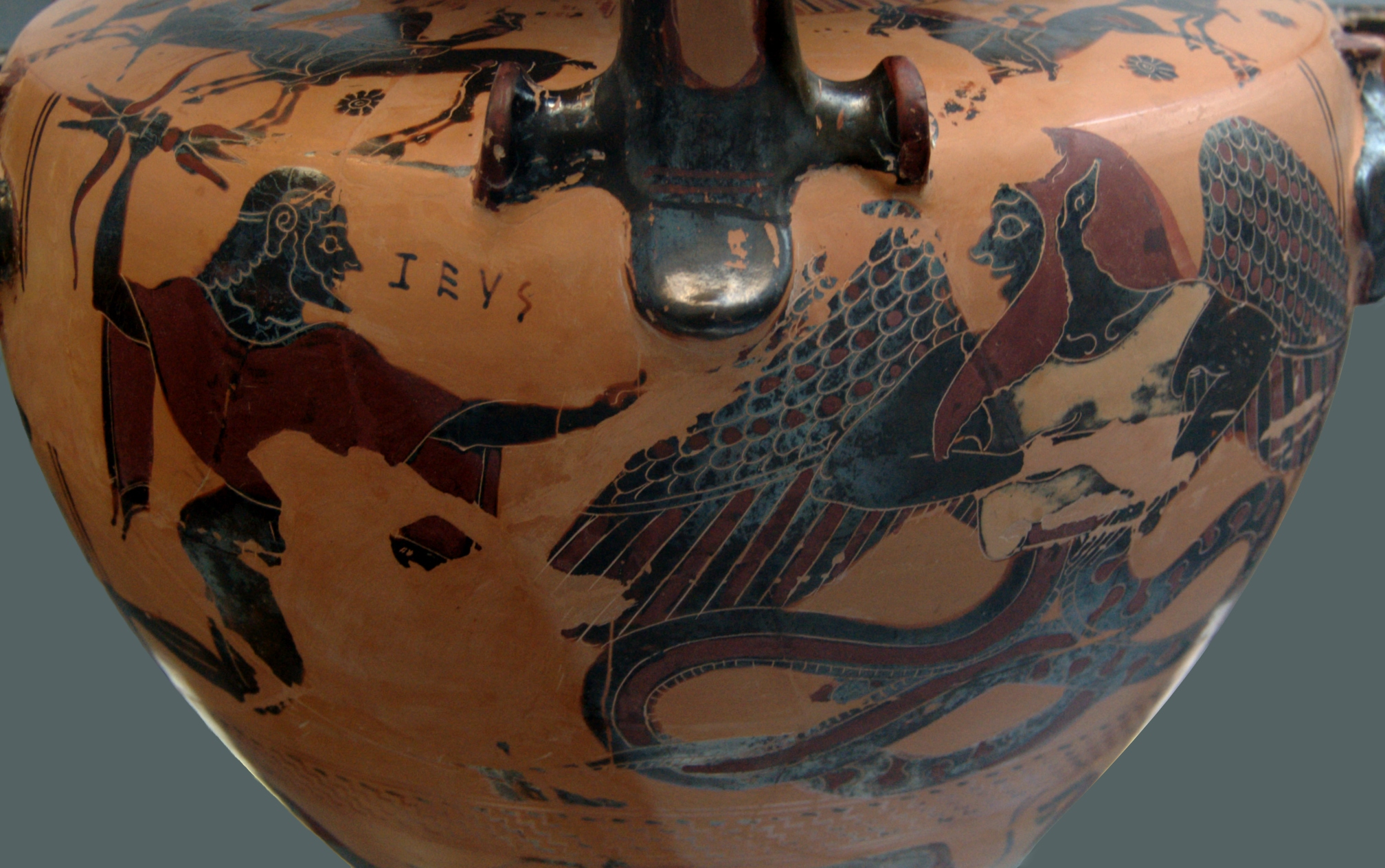
Zeus aiming his thunderbolt at a winged and snake-footed Typhon. Chalcidian black-figured hydria (c. 540–530 BC), Staatliche Antikensammlungen (Inv. 596).

Typhon (/ˈtaɪfɒn, -fən/; Ancient Greek: Τυφῶν, romanized: Typhôn, [tyːpʰɔ̂ːn]), also known as Typhoeus (/taɪˈfiːəs/; Τυφωεύς, Typhōeús), Typhaon (Τυφάων, Typháōn) or Typhos (Τυφώς, Typhṓs), was a monstrous serpentine giant and one of the deadliest creatures in Greek mythology. According to Hesiod, Typhon was the son of Gaia and Tartarus. However, one source has Typhon as the son of Hera alone, while another makes Typhon the offspring of Cronus. Typhon and his mate Echidna were the progenitors of many famous monsters.

Typhon attempted to overthrow Zeus for the supremacy of the cosmos. The two fought a cataclysmic battle, which Zeus finally won with the aid of his thunderbolts. Defeated, Typhon was cast into Tartarus, or buried underneath Mount Etna, or in later accounts, the island of Ischia.

Typhon mythology is part of the Greek succession myth, which explained how Zeus came to rule the gods. Typhon's story is also connected with that of Python (the serpent killed by Apollo), and both stories probably derived from several Near Eastern antecedents. Typhon was (from c. 500 BC) also identified with the Egyptian god of destruction Set. In later accounts, Typhon was often confused with the Giants.

== Mythology ==
=== Birth ===
According to Hesiod's Theogony (c. 8th–7th century BC), Typhon was the son of Gaia (Earth) and Tartarus: "when Zeus had driven the Titans from heaven, huge Earth bore her youngest child Typhoeus of the love of Tartarus, by the aid of golden Aphrodite". The mythographer Apollodorus (1st or 2nd century AD) adds that Gaia bore Typhon in anger at the gods for their destruction of her offspring the Giants.

Numerous other sources mention Typhon as being the offspring of Gaia, or simply "earth-born", with no mention of Tartarus. However, according to the Homeric Hymn to Apollo (6th century BC), Typhon was the child of Hera alone. Hera, angry at Zeus for having given birth to Athena by himself, prayed to Gaia, Uranus, and the Titans, to give her a son stronger than Zeus, then slapped the ground and became pregnant. Hera gave the infant Typhon to the serpent Python to raise, and Typhon grew up to become a great bane to mortals.

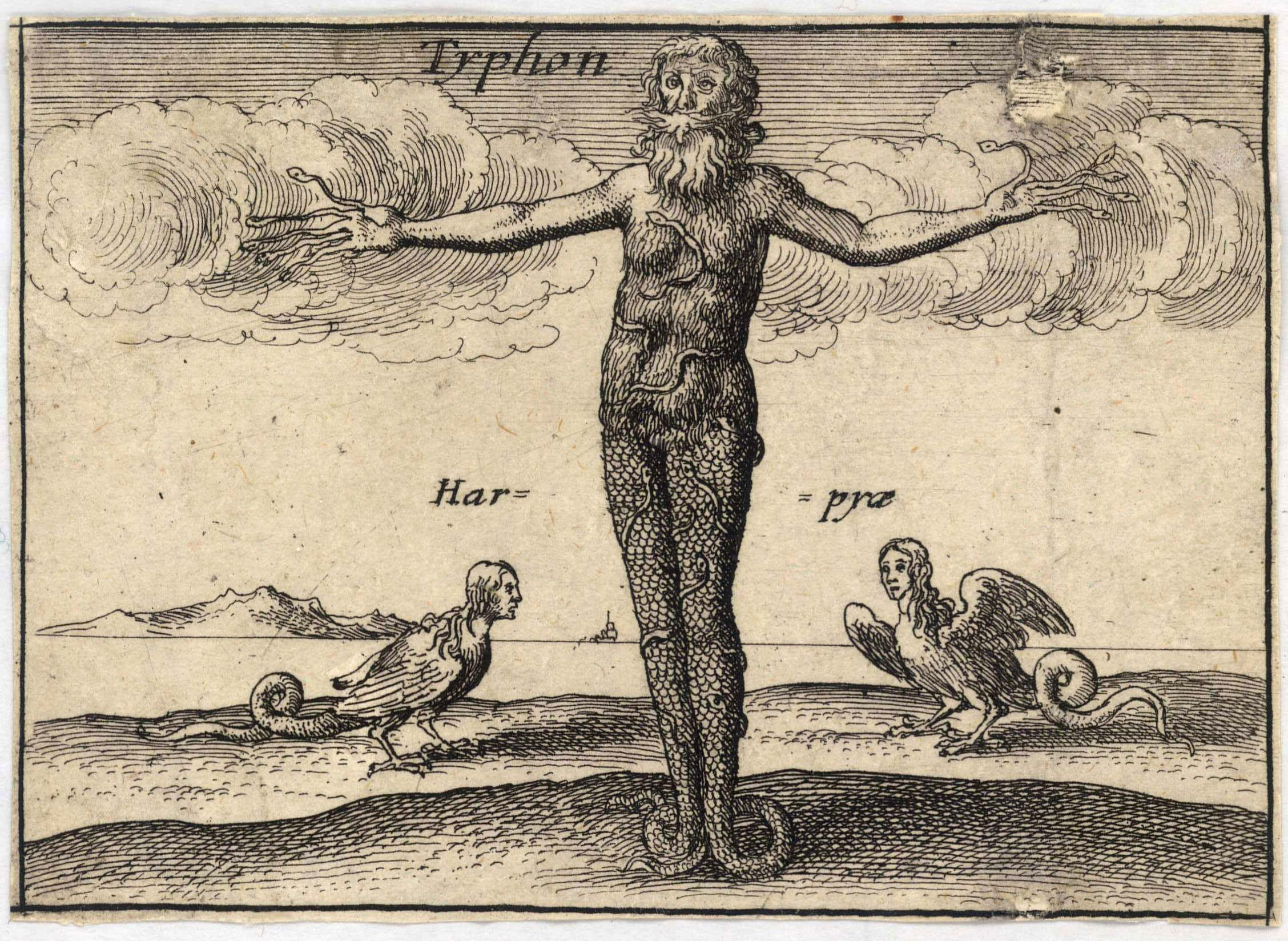
Depiction by Wenceslaus Hollar

Several sources locate Typhon's birth and dwelling place in Cilicia, and in particular the region in the vicinity of the ancient Cilician coastal city of Corycus (modern Kızkalesi, Turkey). The poet Pindar (c. 470 BC) calls Typhon "Cilician", and says that Typhon was born in Cilicia and nurtured in "the famous Cilician cave", an apparent allusion to the Corycian cave in Turkey. In Aeschylus's Prometheus Bound, Typhon is called the "dweller of the Cilician caves", and both Apollodorus and the poet Nonnus (4th or 5th century AD) have Typhon born in Cilicia.

The b scholia to Iliad 2.783, preserving a possibly Orphic tradition, has Typhon born in Cilicia, as the offspring of Cronus. Gaia, angry at the destruction of the Giants, slanders Zeus to Hera. So Hera goes to Cronus, the father of her and Zeus (whom Zeus had overthrown), and Cronus gives Hera two eggs smeared with his own semen, telling her to bury them underground, and that from them would be born one who would overthrow Zeus. Hera, angry at Zeus, buries the eggs in Cilicia "under Arimon", but when Typhon is born, Hera, now reconciled with Zeus, informs him.

=== Descriptions ===
According to Hesiod, Typhon was "terrible, outrageous and lawless", immensely powerful, and on his shoulders were one hundred snake heads, that emitted fire and every kind of noise:

Strength was with his hands in all that he did and the feet of the strong god were untiring. From his shoulders grew a hundred heads of a snake, a fearful dragon, with dark, flickering tongues, and from under the brows of his eyes in his marvelous heads flashed fire, and fire burned from his heads as he glared. And there were voices in all his dreadful heads which uttered every kind of sound unspeakable; for at one time they made sounds such that the gods understood, but at another, the noise of a bull bellowing aloud in proud ungovernable fury; and at another, the sound of a lion, relentless of heart; and at another, sounds like whelps, wonderful to hear; and again, at another, he would hiss, so that the high mountains re-echoed.

The Homeric Hymn to Apollo describes Typhon as "fell" and "cruel", and like neither gods nor men. Three of Pindar's poems have Typhon as hundred-headed (as in Hesiod), while apparently a fourth gives him only fifty heads, but a hundred heads for Typhon became standard. A Chalcidian hydria (c. 540–530 BC), depicts Typhon as a winged humanoid from the waist up, with two snake tails for legs below. Aeschylus calls Typhon "fire-breathing". For Nicander (2nd century BC), Typhon was a monster of enormous strength, and strange appearance, with many heads, hands, and wings, and with huge snake coils coming from his thighs.

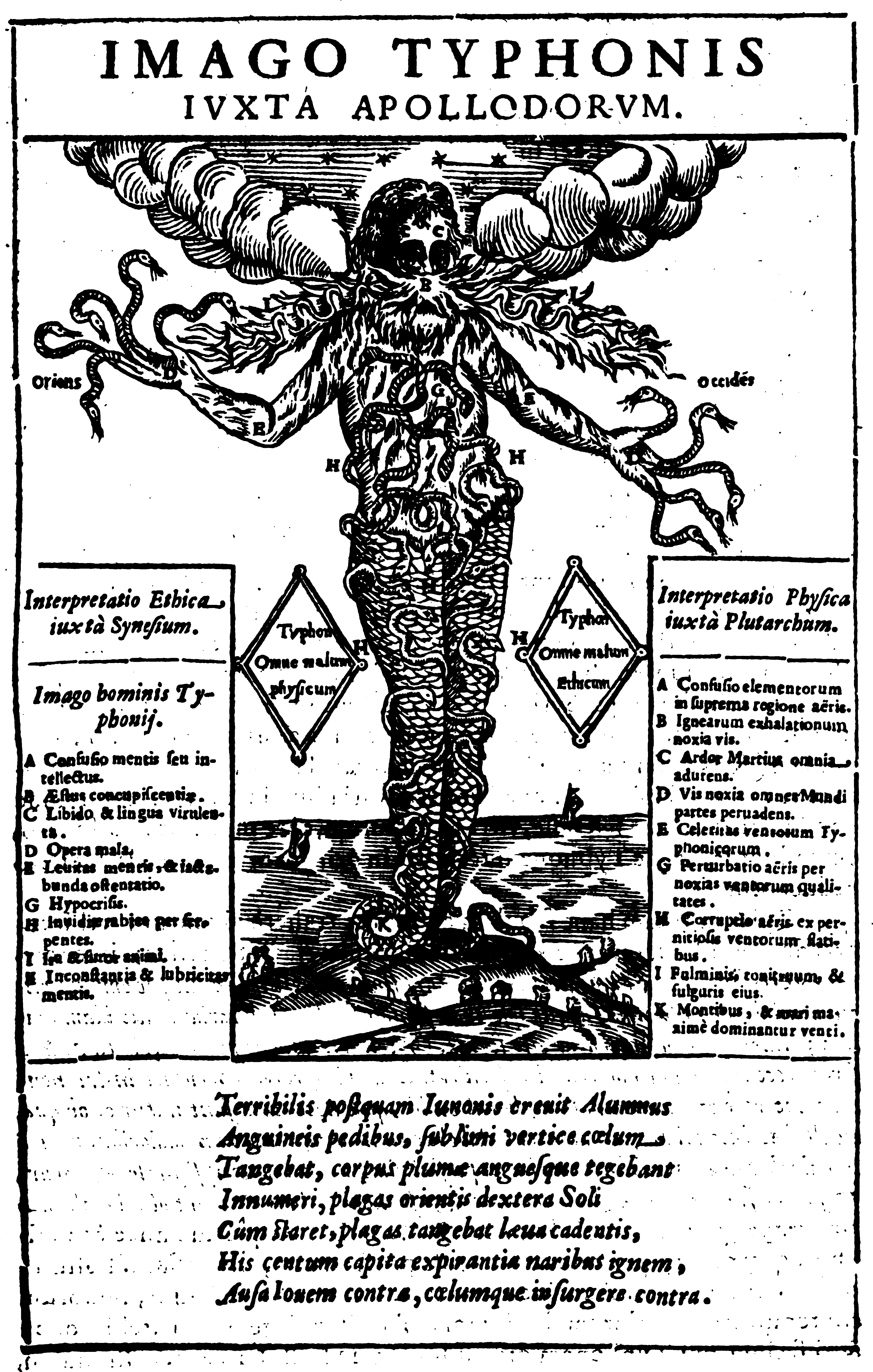
Illustration of Typhon from Athanasius Kircher's Oedipus Aegyptiacus, 1652

Apollodorus describes Typhon as a huge winged monster, whose head "brushed the stars", human in form above the waist, with snake coils below, and fire flashing from his eyes:

In size and strength he surpassed all the offspring of Earth. As far as the thighs he was of human shape and of such prodigious bulk that he out-topped all the mountains, and his head often brushed the stars. One of his hands reached out to the west and the other to the east, and from them projected a hundred dragons' heads. From the thighs downward he had huge coils of vipers, which when drawn out, reached to his very head and emitted a loud hissing. His body was all winged: unkempt hair streamed on the wind from his head and cheeks; and fire flashed from his eyes.

The most elaborate description of Typhon is found in Nonnus's Dionysiaca. Nonnus makes numerous references to Typhon's serpentine nature, giving him a "tangled army of snakes", snaky feet, and hair. According to Nonnus, Typhon was a "poison-spitting viper", whose "every hair belched viper-poison", and Typhon "spat out showers of poison from his throat; the mountain torrents were swollen, as the monster showered fountains from the viperish bristles of his high head", and "the water-snakes of the monster's viperish feet crawl into the caverns underground, spitting poison!".

Following Hesiod and others, Nonnus gives Typhon many heads (though untotaled), but in addition to snake heads, Nonnus also gives Typhon many other animal heads, including leopards, lions, bulls, boars, bears, cattle, wolves, and dogs, which combine to make 'the cries of all wild beasts together', and a "babel of screaming sounds". Nonnus also gives Typhon "legions of arms innumerable", and where Nicander had only said that Typhon had "many" hands, and Ovid had given Typhon a hundred hands, Nonnus gives Typhon two hundred.

=== Offspring ===
According to Hesiod's Theogony, Typhon "was joined in love" to Echidna, a monstrous half-woman and half-snake, who bore Typhon "fierce offspring". First, according to Hesiod, there was Orthrus, the two-headed dog who guarded the Cattle of Geryon, second Cerberus, the multiheaded dog who guarded the gates of Hades, and third the Lernaean Hydra, the many-headed serpent who, when one of its heads was cut off, grew two more. The Theogony next mentions an ambiguous "she", which might refer to Echidna, as the mother of the Chimera (a fire-breathing beast that was part lion, part goat, and had a snake-headed tail) with Typhon then being the father.

While mentioning Cerberus and "other monsters" as being the offspring of Echidna and Typhon, the mythographer Acusilaus (6th century BC) adds the Caucasian Eagle that ate the liver of Prometheus. The mythographer Pherecydes of Athens (5th century BC) also names Prometheus's eagle, and adds Ladon (though Pherecydes does not use this name), the dragon that guarded the golden apples in the Garden of the Hesperides (according to Hesiod, the offspring of Ceto and Phorcys). The lyric poet Lasus of Hermione (6th century BC) adds the Sphinx.

Later authors mostly retain these offspring of Typhon by Echidna, while adding others. Apollodorus, in addition to naming as their offspring Orthrus, the Chimera (citing Hesiod as his source), the Caucasian Eagle, Ladon, and the Sphinx, also adds the Nemean lion (no mother is given), and the Crommyonian Sow, killed by the hero Theseus (unmentioned by Hesiod).

Hyginus (1st century BC), in his list of offspring of Typhon (all by Echidna), retains from the above: Cerberus, the Chimera, the Sphinx, the Hydra and Ladon, and adds "Gorgon" (by which Hyginus means the mother of Medusa, whereas Hesiod's three Gorgons, of which Medusa was one, were the daughters of Ceto and Phorcys), the Colchian dragon that guarded the Golden Fleece and Scylla. The Harpies, in Hesiod the daughters of Thaumas and the Oceanid Electra, in one source, are said to be the daughters of Typhon.

The sea serpents which attacked the Trojan priest Laocoön, during the Trojan War, were perhaps supposed to be the progeny of Typhon and Echidna. According to Hesiod, the defeated Typhon is the father of destructive storm winds.

=== Battle with Zeus ===
Typhon challenged Zeus for rule of the cosmos. The earliest mention of Typhon, and his only occurrence in Homer, is a passing reference in the Iliad to Zeus striking the ground around where Typhon lies defeated. Hesiod's Theogony gives the first account of their battle. According to Hesiod, without the quick action of Zeus, Typhon would have "come to reign over mortals and immortals". In the Theogony Zeus and Typhon meet in cataclysmic conflict:

[Zeus] thundered hard and mightily: and the earth around resounded terribly and the wide heaven above, and the sea and Ocean's streams and the nether parts of the earth. Great Olympus reeled beneath the divine feet of the king as he arose and earth groaned thereat. And through the two of them heat took hold on the dark-blue sea, through the thunder and lightning, and through the fire from the monster, and the scorching winds and blazing thunderbolt. The whole earth seethed, and sky and sea: and the long waves raged along the beaches round and about at the rush of the deathless gods: and there arose an endless shaking. Hades trembled where he rules over the dead below, and the Titans under Tartarus who live with Cronos, because of the unending clamor and the fearful strife.

Zeus with his thunderbolt easily overcomes Typhon, who is thrown down to earth in a fiery crash:

So when Zeus had raised up his might and seized his arms, thunder and lightning and lurid thunderbolt, he leaped from Olympus and struck him, and burned all the marvellous heads of the monster about him. But when Zeus had conquered him and lashed him with strokes, Typhoeus was hurled down, a maimed wreck, so that the huge earth groaned. And flame shot forth from the thunderstricken lord in the dim rugged glens of the mount, when he was smitten. A great part of huge earth was scorched by the terrible vapor and melted as tin melts when heated by men's art in channelled crucibles; or as iron, which is hardest of all things, is shortened by glowing fire in mountain glens and melts in the divine earth through the strength of Hephaestus. Even so, then, the earth melted in the glow of the blazing fire.

Defeated, Typhon is cast into Tartarus by an angry Zeus.

Epimenides (7th or 6th century BC) seemingly knew a different version of the story, in which Typhon enters Zeus's palace while Zeus is asleep, but Zeus awakes and kills Typhon with a thunderbolt. Pindar apparently knew of a tradition which had the gods, in order to escape from Typhon, transform themselves into animals, and flee to Egypt. Pindar calls Typhon the "enemy of the gods", and says that he was defeated by Zeus's thunderbolt. In one poem Pindar has Typhon being held prisoner by Zeus under Etna, and in another says that Typhon "lies in dread Tartarus", stretched out underground between Mount Etna and Cumae. In Aeschylus's Prometheus Bound, a "hissing" Typhon, his eyes flashing, "withstood all the gods", but "the unsleeping bolt of Zeus" struck him, and "he was burnt to ashes and his strength blasted from him by the lightning bolt. And now, a helpless and a sprawling bulk, he lies hard by the narrows of the sea, pressed down beneath the roots of Aetna; while on the topmost summit Hephaestus sits and hammers the molten ore. There, one day, shall burst forth [370] rivers of fire,1with savage jaws devouring the level fields of Sicily, land of fair fruit—such boiling rage shall Typho, although charred by the blazing lightning of Zeus, send spouting forth with hot jets of appalling, fire-breathing surge."

According to Pherecydes of Athens, during his battle with Zeus, Typhon first flees to the Caucasus, which begins to burn, then to the volcanic island of Pithecussae (modern Ischia), off the coast of Cumae, where he is buried under the island. Apollonius of Rhodes (3rd century BC), like Pherecydes, presents a multi-stage battle, with Typhon being struck by Zeus's thunderbolt on mount Caucasus, before fleeing to the mountains and plain of Nysa, and ending up (as already mentioned by the fifth-century BC Greek historian Herodotus) buried under Lake Serbonis in Egypt.

Like Pindar, Nicander has all the gods, but Zeus and Athena, transform into animal forms and flee to Egypt: Apollo became a hawk, Hermes an ibis, Ares a fish, Artemis a cat, Dionysus a goat, Heracles a fawn, Hephaestus an ox, and Leto a mouse.

The geographer Strabo (c. 20 AD) gives several locations which were associated with the battle. According to Strabo, Typhon was said to have cut the serpentine channel of the Orontes River, which flowed beneath the Syrian Mount Kasios (modern Jebel Aqra), while fleeing from Zeus, and some placed the battle at Catacecaumene ("Burnt Land"), a volcanic plain, on the upper Gediz River, between the ancient kingdoms of Lydia, Mysia and Phrygia, near Mount Tmolus (modern Bozdağ) and Sardis the ancient capital of Lydia.

In the versions of the battle given by Hesiod, Aeschylus and Pindar, Zeus's defeat of Typhon is straightforward; however, a more involved version of the battle is given by Apollodorus. No early source gives any reason for the conflict, but Apollodorus's account seemingly implies that Typhon had been produced by Gaia to avenge the destruction, by Zeus and the other gods, of the Giants, a previous generation of offspring of Gaia. According to Apollodorus, Typhon, "hurling kindled rocks", attacked the gods, "with hissings and shouts, spouting a great jet of fire from his mouth." Seeing this, the gods transformed into animals and fled to Egypt (as in Pindar and Nicander). However "Zeus pelted Typhon at a distance with thunderbolts, and at close quarters struck him down with an adamantine sickle". Wounded, Typhon fled to the Syrian Mount Kasios, where Zeus "grappled" with him. But Typhon, twining his snaky coils around Zeus, was able to wrest away the sickle and cut the sinews from Zeus's hands and feet. Typhon carried the disabled Zeus across the sea to the Corycian cave in Cilicia where he set the she-serpent Delphyne to guard over Zeus and his severed sinews, which Typhon had hidden in a bearskin. But Hermes and Aegipan (possibly another name for Pan) stole the sinews and gave them back to Zeus. His strength restored, Zeus chased Typhon to mount Nysa, where the Moirai tricked Typhon into eating "ephemeral fruits" which weakened him. Typhon then fled to Thrace, where he threw mountains at Zeus, which were turned back on him by Zeus's thunderbolts, and the mountain where Typhon stood, being drenched with Typhon's blood, became known as Mount Haemus (Bloody Mountain). Typhon then fled to Sicily, where Zeus threw Mount Etna on top of Typhon burying him, and so finally defeated him.

Oppian (2nd century AD) says that Pan helped Zeus in the battle by tricking Typhon to come out from his lair, and into the open, by the "promise of a banquet of fish", thus enabling Zeus to defeat Typhon with his thunderbolts.

==== Nonnus's Dionysiaca ====
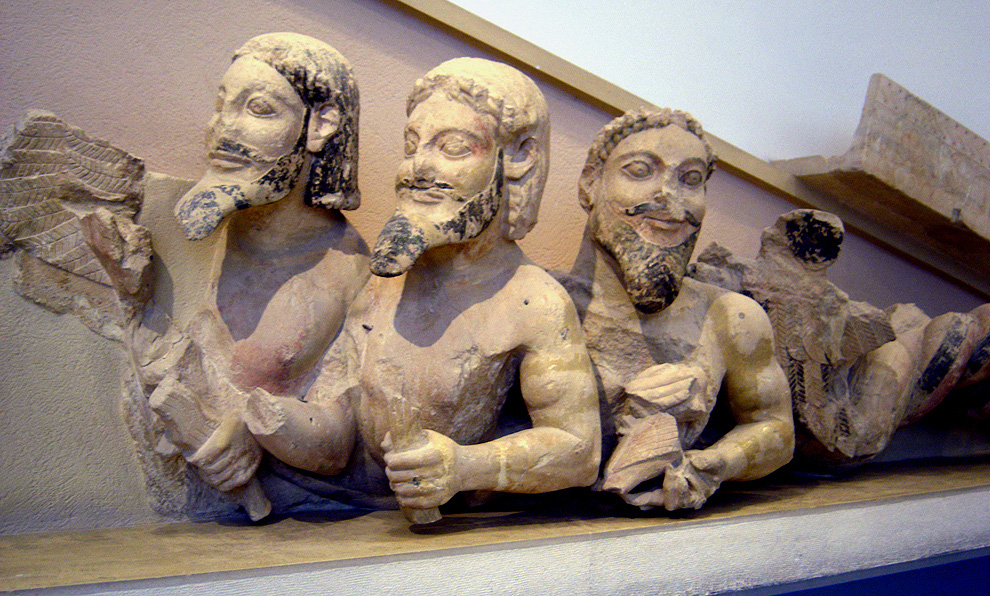
The three-bodied daemon, perhaps Typhon. Acropolis Museum, Greece.

The longest and most involved version of the battle appears in Nonnus's Dionysiaca (late 4th or early 5th century AD). Zeus hides his thunderbolts in a cave, so that he might seduce the maiden Pluto, and so produce Tantalus. But smoke rising from the thunderbolts, enables Typhon, under the guidance of Gaia, to locate Zeus's weapons, steal them, and hide them in another cave. Immediately Typhon extends "his clambering hands into the upper air" and begins a long and concerted attack upon the heavens. Then "leaving the air" he turns his attack upon the seas. Finally Typhon attempts to wield Zeus's thunderbolts, but they "felt the hands of a novice, and all their manly blaze was unmanned".

Now Zeus's sinews had somehow—Nonnus does not say how or when—fallen to the ground during their battle, and Typhon had taken them also. But Zeus devises a plan with Cadmus and Pan to beguile Typhon. Cadmus, disguised as a shepherd, enchants Typhon by playing the panpipes, and Typhon entrusting the thunderbolts to Gaia, sets out to find the source of the music he hears. Finding Cadmus, he challenges him to a contest, offering Cadmus any goddess as wife, excepting Hera whom Typhon has reserved for himself. Cadmus then tells Typhon that, if he liked the "little tune" of his pipes, then he would love the music of his lyre—if only it could be strung with Zeus's sinews. So Typhon retrieves the sinews and gives them to Cadmus, who hides them in another cave, and again begins to play his bewitching pipes, so that "Typhoeus yielded his whole soul to Cadmos for the melody to charm".

With Typhon distracted, Zeus takes back his thunderbolts. Cadmus stops playing, and Typhon, released from his spell, rushes back to his cave to discover the thunderbolts gone. Incensed Typhon unleashes devastation upon the world: animals are devoured, (Typhon's many animal heads each eat animals of its own kind), rivers turned to dust, seas made dry land, and the land "laid waste".

The day ends with Typhon yet unchallenged, and while the other gods "moved about the cloudless Nile", Zeus waits through the night for the coming dawn. Victory "reproaches" Zeus, urging him to "stand up as champion of your own children!" Dawn comes and Typhon roars out a challenge to Zeus. And a cataclysmic battle for "the sceptre and throne of Zeus" is joined. Typhon piles up mountains as battlements and with his "legions of arms innumerable", showers volley after volley of trees and rocks at Zeus, but all are destroyed, or blown aside, or dodged, or thrown back at Typhon. Typhon throws torrents of water at Zeus's thunderbolts to quench them, but Zeus is able to cut off some of Typhon's hands with "frozen volleys of air as by a knife", and hurling thunderbolts is able to burn more of Typhon's "endless hands", and cut off some of his "countless heads". Typhon is attacked by the four winds, and "frozen volleys of jagged hailstones". Gaia tries to aid her burnt and frozen son. Finally Typhon falls, and Zeus shouts out a long stream of mocking taunts, telling Typhon that he is to be buried under Sicily's hills, with a cenotaph over him which will read "This is the barrow of Typhoeus, son of Earth, who once lashed the sky with stones, and the fire of heaven burnt him up".

=== Burial and cause of volcanic activity ===
==== Etna and Ischia ====
Most accounts have the defeated Typhon buried under either Mount Etna in Sicily, or the volcanic island of Ischia, the largest of the Phlegraean Islands off the coast of Naples, with Typhon being the cause of volcanic eruptions and earthquakes.

Though Hesiod has Typhon simply cast into Tartarus by Zeus, some have read a reference to Mount Etna in Hesiod's description of Typhon's fall:

And flame shot forth from the thunderstricken lord in the dim rugged glens of the mount when he was smitten. A great part of huge earth was scorched by the terrible vapor and melted as tin melts when heated by men's art in channelled crucibles; or as iron, which is hardest of all things, is shortened by glowing fire in mountain glens and melts in the divine earth through the strength of Hephaestus. Even so, then, the earth melted in the glow of the blazing fire.

The first certain references to Typhon buried under Etna, as well as being the cause of its eruptions, occur in Pindar:

Son of Cronus, you who hold Aetna, the wind-swept weight on terrible hundred-headed Typhon,

and:

among them is he who lies in dread Tartarus, that enemy of the gods, Typhon with his hundred heads. Once the famous Cilician cave nurtured him, but now the sea-girt cliffs above Cumae, and Sicily too, lie heavy on his shaggy chest. And the pillar of the sky holds him down, snow-covered Aetna, year-round nurse of bitter frost, from whose inmost caves belch forth the purest streams of unapproachable fire. In the daytime her rivers roll out a fiery flood of smoke, while in the darkness of night the crimson flame hurls rocks down to the deep plain of the sea with a crashing roar. That monster shoots up the most terrible jets of fire; it is a marvellous wonder to see, and a marvel even to hear about when men are present. Such a creature is bound beneath the dark and leafy heights of Aetna and beneath the plain, and his bed scratches and goads the whole length of his back stretched out against it.

Thus Pindar has Typhon in Tartarus, and buried under not just Etna, but under a vast volcanic region stretching from Sicily to Cumae (in the vicinity of modern Naples), a region which presumably also included Mount Vesuvius, as well as Ischia.

Many subsequent accounts mention either Etna or Ischia. In Prometheus Bound, Typhon is imprisoned underneath Etna, while above him Hephaestus "hammers the molten ore", and in his rage, the "charred" Typhon causes "rivers of fire" to pour forth. Ovid has Typhon buried under all of Sicily, with his left and right hands under Pelorus and Pachynus, his feet under Lilybaeus, and his head under Etna; where he "vomits flames from his ferocious mouth". And Valerius Flaccus has Typhon's head under Etna, and all of Sicily shaken when Typhon "struggles". Lycophron has both Typhon and Giants buried under the island of Ischia. Virgil, Silius Italicus and Claudian, all calling the island "Inarime", have Typhon buried there. Strabo, calling Ischia "Pithecussae", reports the "myth" that Typhon lay buried there, and that when he "turns his body the flames and the waters, and sometimes even small islands containing boiling water, spout forth."

In addition to Typhon, other mythological beings were also said to be buried under Mount Etna and the cause of its volcanic activity. Most notably the Giant Enceladus was said to be entombed under Etna, the volcano's eruptions being the breath of Enceladus, and its tremors caused by the Giant rolling over from side to side beneath the mountain. Also said to be buried under Etna were the Hundred-hander Briareus, and Asteropus who was perhaps one of the Cyclopes.

==== Boeotia ====
Typhon's final resting place was apparently also said to be in Boeotia. The Hesiodic Shield of Heracles names a mountain near Thebes Typhaonium, perhaps reflecting an early tradition which also had Typhon buried under a Boeotian mountain. And some apparently claimed that Typhon was buried beneath a mountain in Boeotia, from which came exhalations of fire.

=== "Couch of Typhoeus" ===
Homer describes a place he calls the "couch [or bed] of Typhoeus", which he locates in the land of the Arimoi (εἰν Ἀρίμοις), where Zeus lashes the land about Typhoeus with his thunderbolts. Presumably this is the same land where, according to Hesiod, Typhon's mate Echidna keeps guard "in Arima" (εἰν Ἀρίμοισιν).

But neither Homer nor Hesiod say anything more about where these Arimoi or this Arima might be. The question of whether an historical place was meant, and its possible location, has been, since ancient times, the subject of speculation and debate.

Strabo discusses the question in some detail. Several locales, Cilicia, Syria, Lydia, and the island of Ischia, all places associated with Typhon, are given by Strabo as possible locations for Homer's "Arimoi".

Pindar has his Cilician Typhon slain by Zeus "among the Arimoi", and the historian Callisthenes (4th century BC), located the Arimoi and the Arima mountains in Cilicia, near the Calycadnus river, the Corycian cave and the Sarpedon promontory. The b scholia to Iliad 2.783, mentioned above, says Typhon was born in Cilicia "under Arimon", and Nonnus mentions Typhon's "bloodstained cave of Arima" in Cilicia.

Just across the Gulf of Issus from Corycus, in ancient Syria, was Mount Kasios (modern Jebel Aqra) and the Orontes River, sites associated with Typhon's battle with Zeus, and according to Strabo, the historian Posidonius (c. 2nd century BC) identified the Arimoi with the Aramaeans of Syria.

Alternatively, according to Strabo, some placed the Arimoi at Catacecaumene, while Xanthus of Lydia (5th century BC) added that "a certain Arimus" ruled there. Strabo also tells us that for "some" Homer's "couch of Typhon" was located "in a wooded place, in the fertile land of Hyde", with Hyde being another name for Sardis (or its acropolis), and that Demetrius of Scepsis (2nd century BC) thought that the Arimoi were most plausibly located "in the Catacecaumene country in Mysia". The 3rd-century BC poet Lycophron placed the lair of Typhon's mate Echidna in this region.

Another place, mentioned by Strabo, as being associated with Arima, is the island of Ischia, where according to Pherecydes of Athens, Typhon had fled, and in the area where Pindar and others had said Typhon was buried. The connection to Arima, comes from the island's Greek name Pithecussae, which derives from the Greek word for monkey, and according to Strabo, residents of the island said that "arimoi" was also the Etruscan word for monkeys.

== Name ==
Typhon's name has a number of variants. The earliest forms, Typhoeus and Typhaon, occur prior to the 5th century BC. Homer uses Typhoeus, Hesiod and the Homeric Hymn to Apollo use both Typhoeus and Typhaon. The later forms Typhos and Typhon occur from the 5th century BC onwards, with Typhon becoming the standard form by the end of that century.

Though several possible derivations of the name Typhon have been suggested, the derivation remains uncertain. Consistent with Hesiod's making storm winds Typhon's offspring, some have supposed that Typhon was originally a wind-god, and ancient sources associated him with the Greek words tuphon, tuphos meaning "whirlwind". Other theories include derivation from a Greek root meaning "smoke" (consistent with Typhon's identification with volcanoes), from an Indo-European root (*dhuH-) meaning "abyss" (making Typhon a "Serpent of the Deep"), and from Sapõn the Phoenician name for the Ugaritic god Baal's holy mountain Jebel Aqra (the classical Mount Kasios) associated with the epithet Baʿal Sapōn.

The name may have influenced the Persian word tūfān which is a source of the meteorological term typhoon.

== Comparative mythology ==
=== Succession myth ===
The Typhonomachy—Zeus's battle with, and defeat of Typhon—is just one part of a larger "Succession Myth" given in Hesiod's Theogony. The Hesiodic succession myth describes how Uranus, the original ruler of the cosmos, hid his offspring away inside Gaia, but was overthrown by his Titan son Cronus, who castrated Uranus, and how in turn, Cronus, who swallowed his children as they were born, was himself overthrown by his son Zeus, whose mother had given Cronus a stone wrapped in swaddling clothes to swallow, in place of Zeus. However Zeus is then confronted with one final adversary, Typhon, which he quickly defeats. Now clearly the supreme power in the cosmos, Zeus is elected king of gods. Zeus then establishes and secures his realm through the apportionment of various functions and responsibilities to the other gods, and by means of marriage. Finally, by swallowing his first wife Metis, who was destined to produce a son stronger than himself, Zeus is able to put an end to the cycle of succession.

=== Python ===
Typhon's story seems related to that of another monstrous offspring of Gaia: Python, the serpent killed by Apollo at Delphi, suggesting a possible common origin. Besides the similarity of names, their shared parentage, and the fact that both were snaky monsters killed in single combat with an Olympian god, there are other connections between the stories surrounding Typhon, and those surrounding Python.

Although the Delphic monster killed by Apollo is usually said to be the male serpent Python, in the Homeric Hymn to Apollo, the earliest account of this story, the god kills a nameless she-serpent (drakaina), subsequently called Delphyne, who had been Typhon's foster-mother. Delphyne and Echidna, besides both being intimately connected to Typhon—one as mother, the other as mate—share other similarities. Both were half-maid and half-snake, a plague to men, and associated with the Corycian cave in Cilicia.

Python was also perhaps connected with a different Corycian Cave than the one in Cilicia, this one on the slopes of Parnassus above Delphi, and just as the Corycian cave in Cilicia was thought to be Typhon and Echidna's lair, and associated with Typhon's battle with Zeus, there is evidence to suggest that the Corycian cave above Delphi was supposed to be Python's (or Delphyne's) lair, and associated with his (or her) battle with Apollo.

=== Near Eastern influence ===
From at least as early as Pindar, and possibly as early as Homer and Hesiod (with their references to the Arimoi and Arima), Typhon's birthplace and battle with Zeus were associated with various Near East locales in Cilicia and Syria, including the Corycian Cave, Mount Kasios, and the Orontes River. Besides this coincidence of place, the Hesiodic succession myth, (including the Typhonomachy), as well as other Greek accounts of these myths, exhibit other parallels with several ancient Near Eastern antecedents, and it is generally held that the Greek accounts are intimately connected with, and influenced by, these Near Eastern counterparts. In particular, the Typhonomachy is generally thought to have been influenced by several Near Eastern monster-slaying myths.

==== Mesopotamia ====
Three related god vs. monster combat myths from Mesopotamia, date from at least the early second-millennium BC or earlier. These are the battles of the god Ninurta with the monsters Asag and Anzu, and the god Marduk's battle with the monstrous Tiamat.

===== Ninurta vs. Asag =====
Lugal-e, a late-third-millennium BC Sumerian poem, tells the story of the battle between the Mesopotamian hero-god Ninurta and the terrible monster Asag. Like Typhon, Asag was a monstrous hissing offspring of Earth (Ki), who grew mighty and challenged the rule of Ninurta, who like Zeus, was a storm-god employing winds and floods as weapons. As in Hesiod's account of the Typhonomachy, during their battle, both Asag and Ninurta set fire to the landscape. And like Apollodorus's Typhon, Asag evidently won an initial victory, before being finally overcome by Ninurta.

===== Ninurta vs. Anzû =====
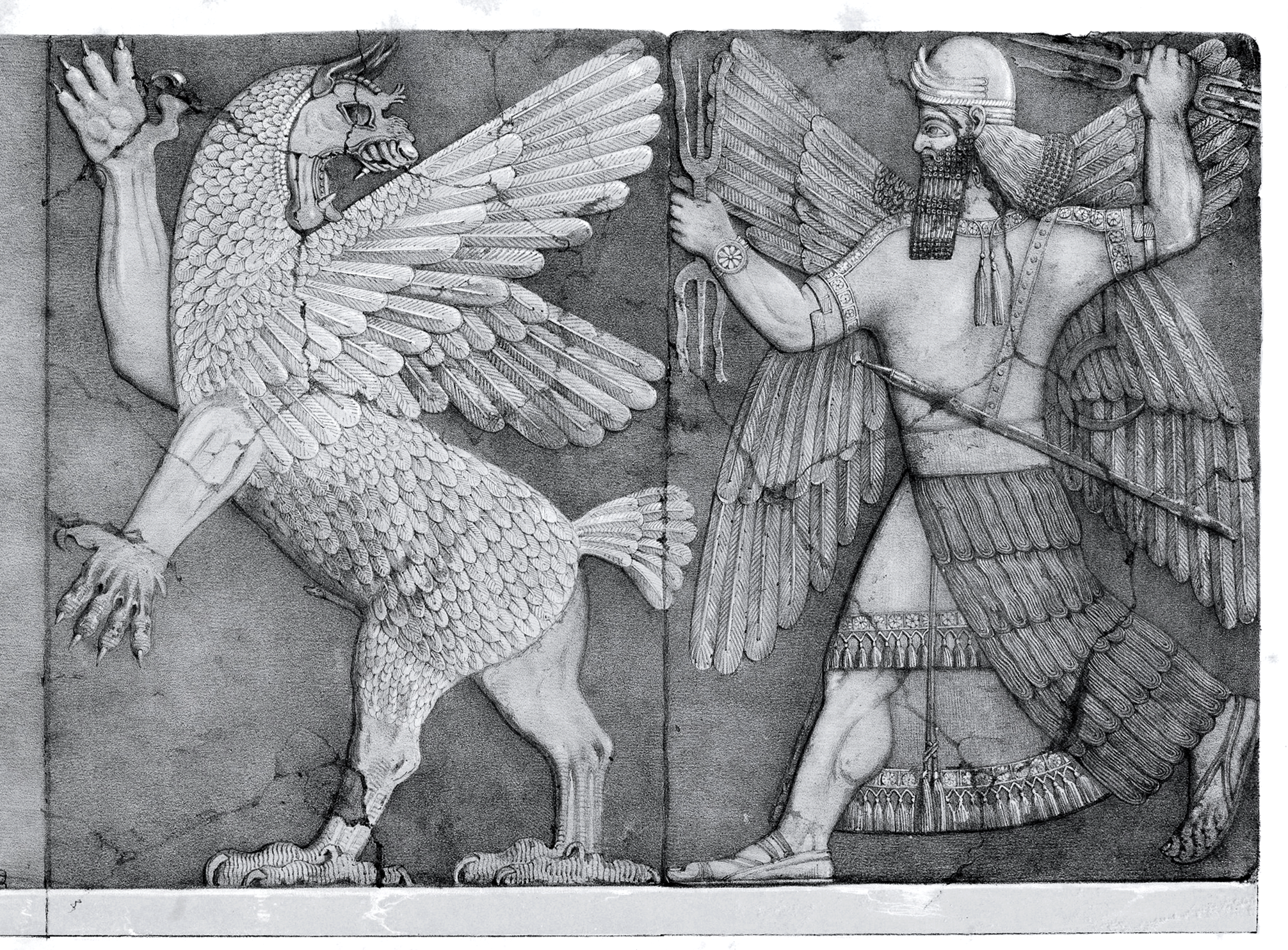
Ninurta with his thunderbolts battles the winged Anzû, palace relief, Nineveh.

The early second millennium BC Akkadian epic Anzû tells the story of another combat of Ninurta with a monstrous challenger. This second foe is the winged monster Anzû, another offspring of Earth. Like Hesiod's Typhon, Anzû roared like a lion, and was the source of destructive storm winds. Ninurta destroys Anzû on a mountainside, and is portrayed as lashing the ground where Anzû lay with a rainstorm and floodwaters, just as Homer has Zeus lash the land about Typhon with his thunderbolts.

===== Marduk vs. Tiamat =====
The early second-millennium BC Babylonian-Akkadian creation epic Enūma Eliš tells the story of the battle of the Babylonian supreme god Marduk with Tiamat, the Sea personified. Like Zeus, Marduk was a storm-god, who employed wind and lightning as weapons, and who, before he can succeed to the kingship of the gods, must defeat a huge and fearsome enemy in single combat. This time the monster is female, and may be related to the Pythian dragoness Delphyne, or Typhon's mate Echidna, since like Echidna, Tiamat was the mother of a brood of monsters.

==== Mount Kasios ====
Like the Typhonomachy, several Near East myths, tell of battles between a storm-god and a snaky monster associated with Mount Kasios, the modern Jebel Aqra. These myths are usually considered to be the origins of the myth of Zeus's battle with Typhon.

===== Baal Sapon vs. Yamm =====
From the south side of the Jebel Aqra, comes the tale of Baal Sapon, and Yamm, the deified Sea (like Tiamat above). Fragmentary Ugaritic tablets, dated to the fourteenth or thirteenth-century BC, tell the story of the Canaanite storm-god Baal Sapon's battle against the monstrous Yamm on Mount Sapuna the Canaanite name for later Greeks' Mount Kasios. Baal defeats Yamm with two throwing clubs (thunderbolts?) named 'Expeller' and 'Chaser', which fly like eagles from the storm-god's hands. Other tablets associate the defeat of the snaky Yamm with the slaying of a seven headed serpent ltn (Litan/Lotan), apparently corresponding to the biblical Leviathan.

===== Tarhunna vs. Illuyanka =====
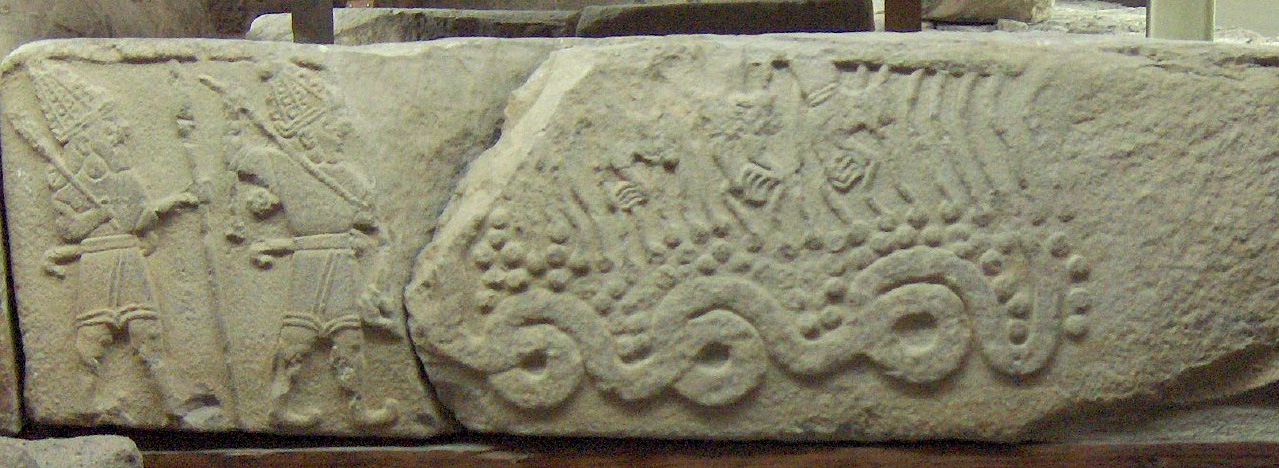
Tarhunna battles the serpent Illuyanka, Museum of Anatolian Civilizations, Ankara, Turkey.

From the north side of the Jebel Aqra, come Hittite myths, c. 1250 BC, which tell two versions of the storm-god Tarhunna's (Tarhunta's) battle against the serpent Illuyanka(s). In both of these versions, Tarhunna suffers an initial defeat against Illuyanka. In one version, Tarhunna seeks help from the goddess Inara, who lures Illuyanka from his lair with a banquet, thereby enabling Tarhunna to surprise and kill Illuyanka. In the other version Illuyanka steals the heart and eyes of the defeated god, but Tarhunna's son marries a daughter of Illuyanka and is able to retrieve Tarhunna's stolen body parts, whereupon Tarhunna kills Illuyanka.

These stories particularly resemble details found in the accounts of the Typhonomachy of Apollodorus, Oppian and Nonnus, which, though late accounts, possibly preserve much earlier ones: The storm-god's initial defeat (Apollodorus, Nonnus), the loss of vital body parts (sinews: Apollodorus, Nonnus), the help of allies (Hermes and Aegipan: Apollodorus; Cadmos and Pan: Nonnus; Pan: Oppian), the luring of the serpentine opponent from his lair through the trickery of a banquet (Oppian, or by music: Nonnus).

===== Teshub vs. Hedammu and Ullikummi =====
Another c. 1250 BC Hittite text, derived from the Hurrians, tells of the Hurrian storm-god Teshub (with whom the Hittite's Tarhunna came to be identified) who lived on Mount Hazzi, the Hurrian name for the Jebel Aqra, and his battle with the sea-serpent Hedammu. Again the storm-god is aided by a goddess Sauska (equivalent to Inaru), who this time seduces the monster with music (as in Nonnus), drink, and sex, successfully luring the serpent from his lair in the sea. Just as the Typhonomachy can be seen as a sequel to the Titanomachy, a different Hittite text derived from the Hurrians, The Song of Ullikummi, a kind of sequel to the Hittite "kingship in heaven" succession myths of which the story of Teshub and Hedammu formed a part, tells of a second monster, this time made of stone, named Ullikummi that Teshub must defeat, in order to secure his rule.

==== Set ====
From apparently as early as Hecataeus of Miletus (c. 550 BC – c. 476 BC), Typhon was identified with Set, the Egyptian god of chaos and storms. This syncretization with Egyptian mythology can also be seen in the story, apparently known as early as Pindar, of Typhon chasing the gods to Egypt, and the gods transforming themselves into animals. Such a story arose perhaps as a way for the Greeks to explain Egypt's animal-shaped gods. Herodotus also identified Typhon with Set, making him the second to last divine king of Egypt. Herodotus says that Typhon was deposed by Osiris's son Horus, whom Herodutus equates with Apollo (with Osiris being equated with Dionysus), and after his defeat by Horus, Typhon was "supposed to have been hidden" in the "Serbonian marsh" (identified with modern Lake Bardawil) in Egypt.

== Confused with the Giants ==
Typhon bears a close resemblance to an older generation of descendants of Gaia, the Giants. They, like their younger brother Typhon after them, challenged Zeus for supremacy of the cosmos, were (in later representations) shown as snake-footed, and end up buried under volcanoes.

While distinct in early accounts, in later accounts Typhon was often considered to be one of the Giants. The Fabulae (c. 2nd century AD), a Latin handbook of mythology, includes Typhon in its list of Giants, while the Roman poet Horace (65 BC – 8 BC), mentions Typhon, along with the Giants Mimas, Porphyrion, and Enceladus, as together battling Athena, during the Gigantomachy. The Astronomica, attributed to the 1st-century AD Roman poet and astrologer Marcus Manilius, and the late 4th-century early 5th-century Greek poet Nonnus, also consider Typhon to be one of the Giants.

== See also ==
- Apep
