= Echidna (mythology) =

Ancient Greek mythological monster

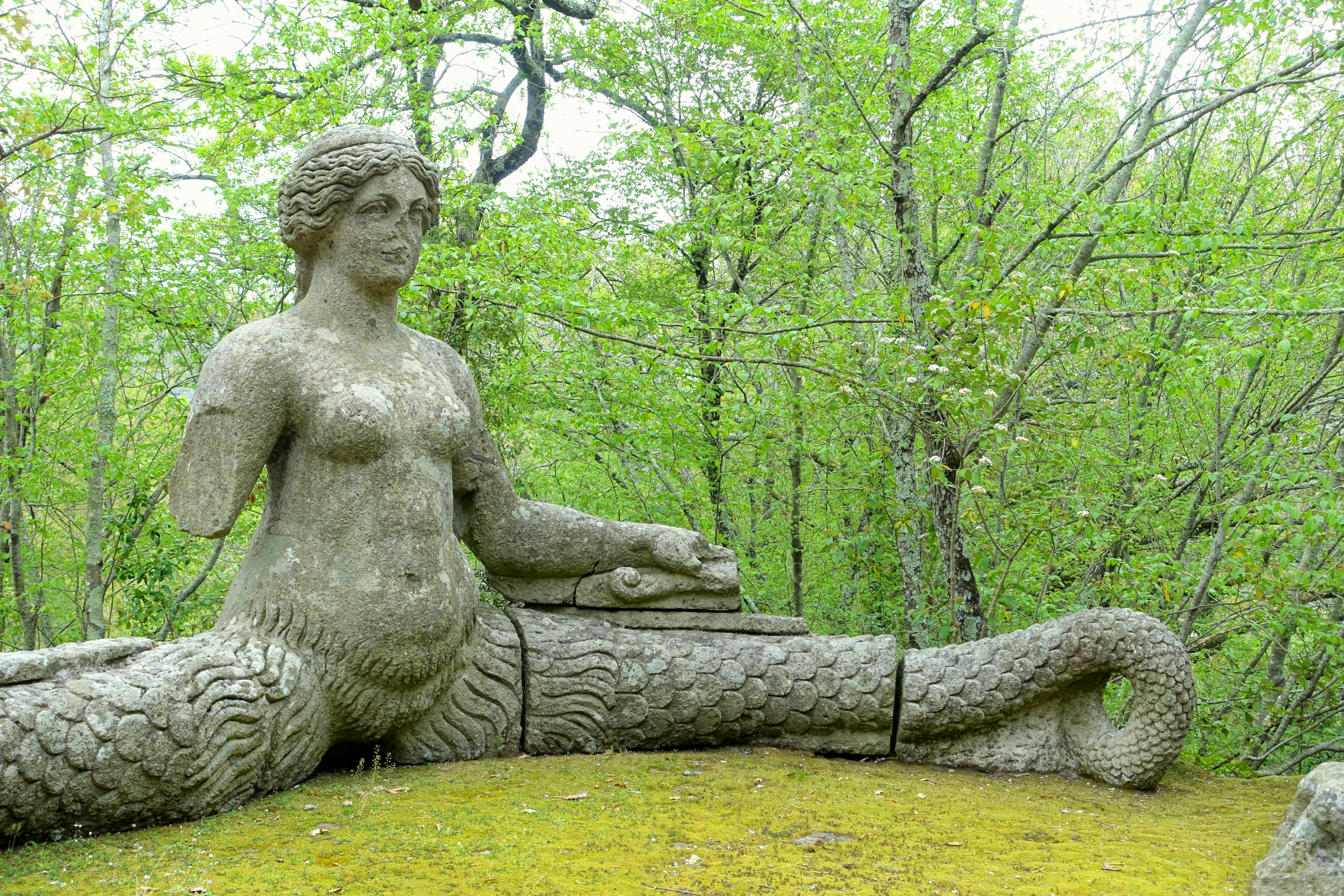
Echidna. Sculpture by Pirro Ligorio 1555, Parco dei Mostri (Monster Park), Lazio, Italy

In Greek mythology, Echidna (/ɪˈkɪdnə/; Ancient Greek: Ἔχιδνα, romanized: Ékhidna, lit. 'she-viper', pronounced [ékʰidna]) was a monster, half-woman and half-snake, who lived alone in a cave. She was the mate of the fearsome monster Typhon and was the mother of many of the most famous monsters of Greek myth.

== Genealogy ==
Echidna's family tree varies by author. The oldest genealogy relating to Echidna, Hesiod's Theogony (c. 8th – 7th century BC), is unclear on several points. According to Hesiod, Echidna was born to a "she" who was probably meant by Hesiod to be the sea goddess Ceto, making Echidna's likely father the sea god Phorcys; however the "she" might instead refer to the Oceanid Callirhoe, which would make Medusa's offspring Chrysaor the father of Echidna. The mythographer Pherecydes of Athens (5th century BC) has Echidna as the daughter of Phorcys, without naming a mother.

Other authors give Echidna other parents. According to the geographer Pausanias (2nd century AD), Epimenides (7th or 6th century BC) had Echidna as the daughter of the Oceanid Styx (goddess of the river Styx) and one Peiras (otherwise unknown to Pausanias), while according to the mythographer Apollodorus (1st or 2nd century AD), Echidna was the daughter of Tartarus and Gaia. In one account, from the Orphic tradition, Echidna was the daughter of Phanes (the Orphic father of all gods).

== Description ==
Hesiod's Echidna was half beautiful maiden and half fearsome snake. Hesiod described "the goddess fierce Echidna" as a flesh eating "monster, irresistible", who was like neither "mortal men" nor "the undying gods", but was "half a nymph with glancing eyes and fair cheeks, and half again a huge snake, great and awful, with speckled skin", who "dies not nor grows old all her days". Hesiod's apparent association of the eating of raw flesh with Echidna's snake half suggests that he may have supposed that Echidna's snake half ended in a snake-head. Aristophanes (late 5th century BC), who makes her a denizen of the underworld, gives Echidna a hundred heads (presumably snake heads), matching the hundred snake heads Hesiod says her mate Typhon had.

In the Orphic account (mentioned above), Echidna is described as having the head of a beautiful woman with long hair and a serpent's body from the neck down. Nonnus, in his Dionysiaca, describes Echidna as being "hideous" with "horrible poison".

== Offspring ==
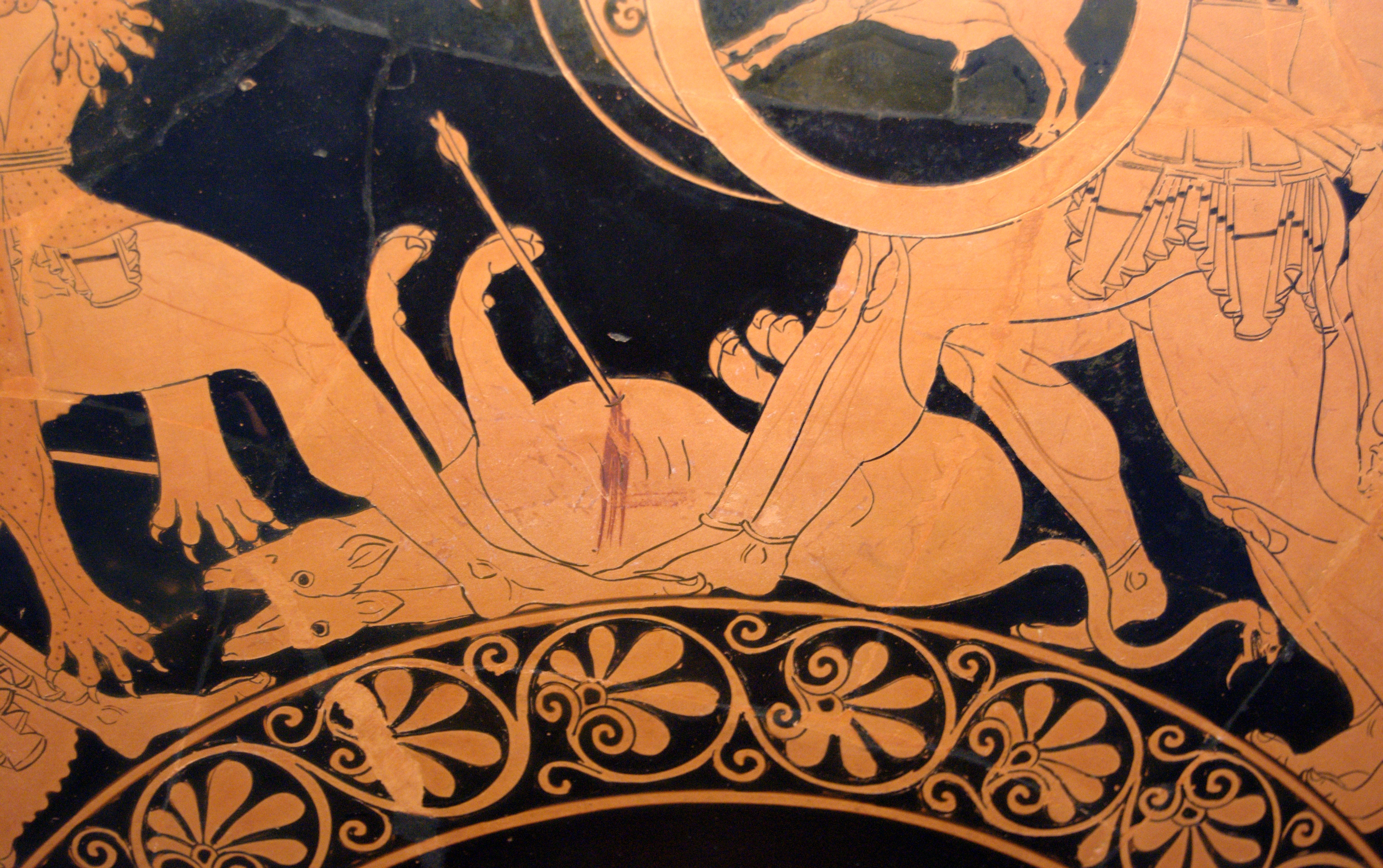
Orthrus

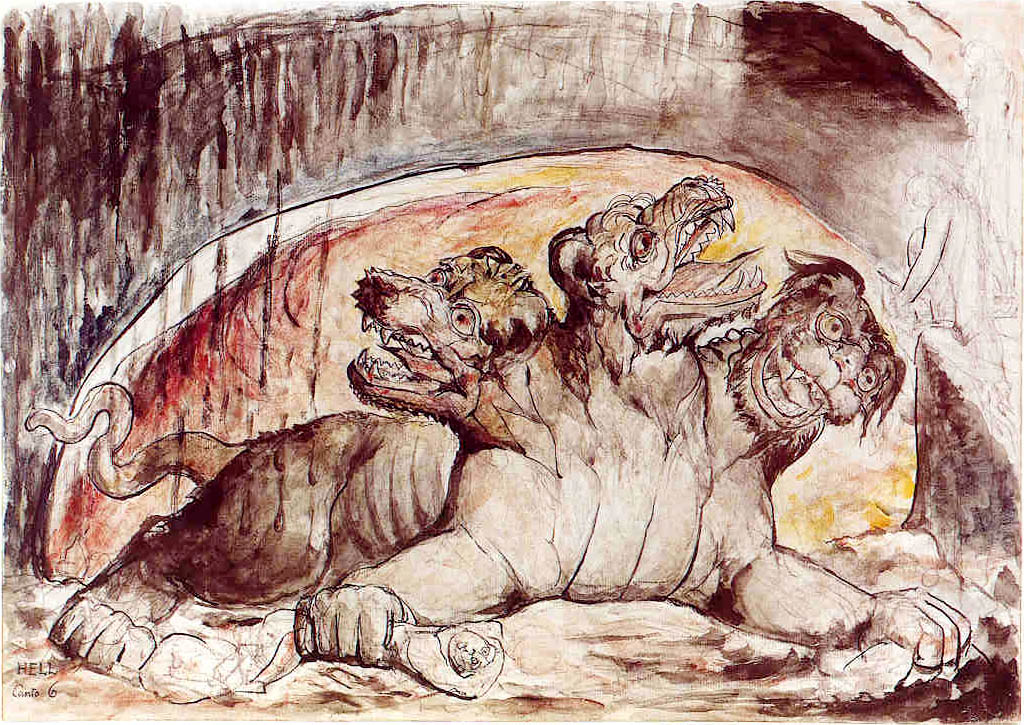
Cerberus, with the gluttons in Dante's Third circle of hell. William Blake.

According to Hesiod's Theogony, the "terrible" and "lawless" Typhon "was joined in love to [Echidna], the maid with glancing eyes" and she bore "fierce offspring". First there was Orthrus, the two-headed dog who guarded the Cattle of Geryon, second Cerberus, the multiheaded dog who guarded the gates of Hades, and third the Lernaean Hydra, the many-headed serpent who, when one of its heads was cut off, grew two back. The Theogony mentions a second ambiguous "she" as the mother of the Chimera (a fire-breathing beast that was part lion, part goat, and had a snake-headed tail) which may refer to Echidna, though possibly the Hydra or even Ceto was meant instead. Hesiod next names two more descendants of Echidna, the Sphinx, a monster with the head of a woman and the body of a winged lion, and the Nemean lion, killed by Heracles as his first labor. According to Hesiod, these two were the offspring of Echidna's son Orthrus and another ambiguous "she", read variously as the Chimera, Echidna herself, or again even Ceto. In any case, the lyric poet Lasus of Hermione (6th century BC) has Echidna and Typhon as the parents of the Sphinx, while the playwright Euripides (5th century BC), has Echidna as her mother, without mentioning a father. While mentioning Cerberus and "other monsters" as being the offspring of Echidna and Typhon, the mythographer Acusilaus (6th century BC) adds the Caucasian Eagle that ate the liver of Prometheus. Pherecydes also names Prometheus's eagle, and adds Ladon (though Pherecydes does not use this name), the dragon that guarded the golden apples in the Garden of the Hesperides (according to Hesiod, the offspring of Ceto and Phorcys).

Later authors mostly retain these offspring of Echidna and Typhon while adding others. Apollodorus, in addition to naming as their offspring Orthrus, the Chimera (citing Hesiod as his source), the Sphinx, the Caucasian Eagle, Ladon, and probably the Nemean lion (only Typhon is named), also adds the Crommyonian Sow, killed by the hero Theseus (unmentioned by Hesiod). Hyginus in his list of offspring of Echidna (all by Typhon), retains from the above Cerberus, the Chimera, the Sphinx, the Hydra and Ladon, and adds "Gorgon" (by which Hyginus means the mother of Medusa, whereas Hesiod's three Gorgons, of which Medusa was one, were the daughters of Ceto and Phorcys), the Colchian dragon that guarded the Golden Fleece and Scylla.

Nonnus makes Echidna the mother of an unnamed, venom-spitting, "huge" son, with "snaky" feet, an ally of Cronus in his war with Zeus, who was killed by Ares. The Harpies, in Hesiod the daughters of Thaumas and the Oceanid Electra, in one source, are said to be the daughters of Typhon, and so perhaps were also considered to be the daughters of Echidna. Likewise, the sea serpents which attacked the Trojan priest Laocoön during the Trojan War, which are called by Quintus Smyrnaeus "fearful monsters of the deadly brood of Typhon", may also have been considered Echidna's offspring. Echidna is sometimes identified with the Viper who was the mother by Heracles of Scythes, an eponymous king of the Scythians, along with his brothers Agathyrsos ("much raging") and Gelonus (see below).

=== List of principal offspring ===
The following table lists the principal offspring of Echidna as given by Hesiod, Apollodorus or Hyginus.

Offspring of Echidna
Offspring	Hesiod, Th.		Apollodorus		Hyginus		Other sources	
Orthrus	✓✓	309	✓✓	2.5.10			?? (Note: Quintus Smyrnaeus has Echidna and Typhon as Cerberus's parents with Orthrus as his brother.)	Quin. Smyr. 6.249–262
Cerberus	✓✓	310 ff.			✓✓	Fab. Pref., 151	✓✓	Acus. fr. 13; Quin. Smyr. loc. cit.
Cerberus	✓✓	310 ff.			✓✓	Fab. Pref., 151	✓?	Bac. Ode 5.62, Soph. Trach. 1097–1099, Call. fr. 515, Ovid Met. 4.500–501, 7.406–409
Lernaean Hydra	✓✓	313 ff.			✓✓	Fab. Pref., 30, 151		
Chimera	?? (Note: It is unclear whom Hesiod meant as the mother of the Chimera: Echidna, the Hydra, or Ceto. See Clay, p. 159, with n. 34; Gantz, p. 22.)	319 ff.	✓✓ (Note: Apollodorus, cites Hesiod as his source for the Chimera being the offspring of Typhon and Echidna.)	2.3.1	✓✓	Fab. Pref., 151		
Sphinx	? (Note: Hesiod gives the Sphinx and the Nemean lion as the offspring of Echidna's son Orthrus and an ambiguous "she", in line 326 of the Theogony, read variously as the Chimera, Echidna herself, or even Ceto. See Clay, p. 159, with n. 34; Most 2018a, p. 29 n. 20; Gantz, p. 23; Caldwell, p. 47 lines 326; West 1966, p. 356 line 326 ἡ δ' ἄρα.)	326 ff.	✓✓	3.5.8	✓✓	Fab. Pref., 151	✓✓	Lasus fr. 706A
Sphinx	?	326 ff.	✓✓	3.5.8	✓✓	Fab. Pref., 151	✓?	Eur. The Phoenician Women 1019–1025
Nemean Lion	?	326 ff.	?✓	2.5.1	(Note: Hyginus says that Luna ("Moon") raised the Nemean Lion in a two-mouthed cave.)	Fab. 30		
Caucasian Eagle			✓✓	2.5.11	(Note: Hyginus gives three possible parentages for the Caucasian Eagle: Typhon and Echidna, Terra and Tartarus, or that it was fashioned by Vulcan and given life by Jove.)	Ast. 2.15.	✓✓	Acus. fr. 13; Pher. fr. 7
Ladon	(Note: Hesiod (though he does not name it Ladon) gives the dragon's parents as Ceto and Phorcys.)	333 ff.	✓✓	2.5.11	✓✓	Fab. Pref., 151	✓✓	Pher. fr. 16b; Tzet. Chiliades 2.36.360
Crommyonian Sow			✓✓	E1.1				
"Gorgon" (mother of Medusa)	(Note: Hesiod and Apollodorus have the three Gorgons, Stheno, Euryale and Medusa as the daughters of Ceto and Phorcys)	270 ff.		1.2.6	✓✓ (Note: For Hyginus, Gorgon was the mother of Medusa.)	Fab. Pref., 151		
Colchian dragon					✓✓	Fab. Pref., 151		
Scylla			(Note: Apollodorus has Crataeis as the mother of Scylla, with Trienus (Triton?) or Phorcus (a variant Phorcys) as father.)	E7.20	✓✓	Fab. Pref., 151		Virgil, Ciris 67

Legend:

✓✓ = Echidna and Typhon given as parents
✓? = Only Echidna given as parent
?✓ = Only Typhon given as parent
?? = Echidna and Typhon possibly meant as parents
? = Echidna possibly meant as parent

== Cave ==
According to Hesiod, Echidna was born in a cave and apparently lived alone (in that same cave, or perhaps another), as Hesiod describes it, "beneath the secret parts of the holy earth ... deep down under a hollow rock far from the deathless gods and mortal men", a place appointed by the gods, where she "keeps guard in Arima". (Though Hesiod here may possibly be referring to Echidna's mother Ceto's home cave instead.) It was perhaps from this same cave that Echidna used to "carry off passersby".

Hesiod locates Echidna's cave in Arima (εἰν Ἀρίμοισιν). Presumably, this is the same place where, in Homer's Iliad, Zeus, with his thunderbolts, lashes the land about Echidna's mate Typhon, described as the land of the Arimoi (εἰν Ἀρίμοις), "where men say is the couch [bed] of Typhoeus", Typhoeus being another name for Typhon. But neither Homer nor Hesiod say anything more about where this Arima might be. The question of whether an historical place was meant, and its possible location, has been since ancient times the subject of speculation and debate.

The geographer Strabo (c. 20 AD) discusses the question in some detail. Several locales, Cilicia, Syria, Lydia, and the Island of Pithecussae (modern Ischia), each associated with Typhon in various ways, are given by Strabo as possible locations for Hesiod's "Arima" (or Homer's "Arimoi").

The region in the vicinity of the ancient Cilician coastal city of Corycus (modern Kızkalesi, Turkey) is often associated with Typhon's birth. The poet Pindar (c. 470 BC), who has Typhon born in Cilicia, and nurtured in "the famous Cilician cave" an apparent allusion to the Corycian cave, also has Zeus slaying Typhon "among the Arimoi". The fourth-century BC historian Callisthenes, located the Arimoi and the Arima mountains in Cilicia, near the Calycadnus river, the Corycian cave and the Sarpedon promontory. The b scholia to Iliad 2.783, preserving a possible Orphic tradition, has Typhon born "under Arimon in Cilicia", and Nonnus mentions Typhon's "bloodstained cave of Arima" in Cilicia.

Just across the Gulf of Issus from Corycus, in ancient Syria, was Mount Kasios (modern Jebel Aqra in Turkey) and the Orontes River, said to be the site of the battle of Typhon and Zeus. According to Strabo, the historian Posidonius identified the Arimoi with the Aramaeans of Syria.

According to some, Arima was instead located in a volcanic plain on the upper Gediz River called the Catacecaumene ("Burnt Land"), situated between the ancient kingdoms of Lydia, Mysia and Phrygia, near Mount Tmolus (modern Bozdağ) and Sardis, the ancient capital of Lydia. According to Strabo, some placed the Arimoi and the battle between Typhon and Zeus at Catacecaumene, while Xanthus of Lydia added that "a certain Arimus" ruled there. Strabo also tells us that, according to "some", Homer's "couch of Typhon" (and hence the Arimoi) was located "in a wooded place, in the fertile land of Hyde", with Hyde being another name for Sardis (or its acropolis), and that Demetrius of Scepsis thought that the Arimoi were most plausibly located "in the Catacecaumene country in Mysia". The third-century BC poet Lycophron placed Echidna's lair in this region.

Another place mentioned by Strabo as being associated with Arima is the volcanic island of Pithecussae, off the coast of ancient Cumae in Italy. According to Pherecydes of Athens, Typhon fled to Pithecussae during his battle with Zeus and, according to Pindar, Typhon lay buried beneath the island. Strabo reports the "myth" that when Typhon "turns his body the flames and the waters, and sometimes even small islands containing boiling water, spout forth". The connection to Arima comes from the island's Greek name Pithecussae, which derives from the Greek word for monkey, and, according to Strabo, residents of the island said that "arimoi" was also the Etruscan word for monkeys.

Quintus Smyrnaeus locates her cave "close on the borders of Eternal Night".

== Death ==
Although for Hesiod Echidna was immortal and ageless, according to Apollodorus Echidna continued to prey on the unfortunate "passers-by" until she was finally killed, while she slept, by Argus Panoptes, the hundred-eyed giant who served Hera.

== The Scythian echidna ==
From the fifth century BC historian Herodotus, we learn of a creature who, though Herodotus does not name as Echidna, is called an echidna ("she-viper") and resembles the Hesiodic Echidna in several respects. She was half woman half snake, lived in a cave, and was known as a mother figure, in this case, as the progenitor of the Scythians (rather than of monsters).

According to Herodotus, Greeks living in Pontus, a region on the southern coast of the Black Sea, told a story of an encounter between Heracles and this snaky creature. Heracles was driving the cattle of Geryones through what would later become Scythia, when one morning he awoke and discovered that his horses had disappeared. While searching for them, he "found in a cave a creature of double form that was half maiden and half serpent; above the buttocks she was a woman, below them a snake". She had the horses and promised to return them if Heracles would have sex with her. Heracles agreed and she had three sons by him: Agathyrsus, Gelonus and Scythes. She asked Heracles what she should do with his sons: "shall I keep them here (since I am queen of this country), or shall I send them away to you?". And Heracles gave her a bow and belt, and told her, that when the boys were grown, whichever would draw the bow and wear the belt, keep him and banish the others. The youngest son Scythes fulfilled the requirements and became the founder and eponym of the Scythians.

== The Viper in the Acts of Philip ==
A possibly related creature to the Hesiodic Echidna is the "Viper" (Echidna) cast into an abyss, by Philip the Apostle, in the apocryphal Acts of Philip. Called a "she dragon" (drakaina) and "the mother of the serpents", this Echidna ruled over many other monstrous dragons and snakes, and lived in a gated temple at Hierapolis, where she was worshipped by the people of that land. She, along with her temple and priests, was swallowed up by a hole in the ground that opened beneath her, as the result of Philip's curse.

== Delphyne ==
Echidna was perhaps associated with the monster killed by Apollo at Delphi. Though that monster is usually said to be the male serpent Python, in the oldest account of this story, the Homeric Hymn to Apollo, the god kills a nameless she-serpent (drakaina), subsequently called Delphyne, who had been Typhon's foster-mother. Echidna and Delphyne share several similarities. Both were half-maid and half-snake, and both were a "plague" (πῆμα) to men. And both were intimately connected to Typhon, and associated with the Corycian cave.

== Iconography ==
No certain ancient depictions of Echidna survive. According to Pausanias, Echidna was depicted, along with Typhon, on the sixth century BC Doric-Ionic temple complex at Amyclae known as the throne of Apollo, designed by Bathycles of Magnesia. Pausanias identifies two standing figures on the left as Echidna and Typhon, with Tritons standing on the right, with no other details concerning these figures given.

== See also ==
- Echidna – a monotreme mammal of Australia and New Guinea named after the mythological monster
- Nāgas – a race of water-dwelling beings of Hindu mythology who are also half-serpent
- Nüwa – a goddess in ancient Chinese mythology best known for creating mankind and repairing the wall of heaven, often depicted as having the body of a snake, or the lower part of her body being that of a snake
