= Arimoi =

Group of people from Greek myth

Arimoi in Greek mythology are the people in whose country (or τὰ Ἄριμα – the place in which) lies under the ground bound by Typhon.

Homer describes a place he calls the "couch [or bed] of Typhoeus", which he locates in the land of the Arimoi (εἰν Ἀρίμοις), where Zeus lashes the land about Typhoeus with his thunderbolts. Presumably this is the same land where, according to Hesiod, Typhon's mate Echidna keeps guard "in Arima" (εἰν Ἀρίμοισιν).

But neither Homer nor Hesiod says anything more about where these Arimoi or this Arima might be. The question of whether a historical place was meant to be and its possible location has been, since ancient times, the subject of speculation and debate.

Strabo discusses the question in some detail. Several locales, Cilicia, Syria, Lydia, and the island of Ischia, all places associated with Typhon, are given by Strabo as possible locations for Homer's "Arimoi". Pindar has his Cilician Typhon slain by Zeus "among the Arimoi", and the historian Callisthenes (4th century BC), located the Arimoi and the Arima mountains in Cilicia, near the Calycadnus river, the Corycian cave and the Sarpedon promontory. The b scholia to Iliad 2.783, mentioned above, says Typhon was born in Cilicia "under Arimon", and Nonnus mentions Typhon's "bloodstained cave of Arima" in Cilicia. Diodorus Siculus localizes them in Phrygia. Just across the Gulf of Issus from Corycus, in ancient Syria, was Mount Kasios (modern Jebel Aqra) and the Orontes River, sites associated with Typhon's battle with Zeus, and according to Strabo, the historian Posidonius (c. 2nd century BC) identified the Arimoi with the Aramaeans of Syria.

Alternatively, according to Strabo, some placed the Arimoi at Katakekaumene, while Xanthus of Lydia (5th century BC) added that "a certain Arimus" ruled there. Strabo also tells us that for "some" Homer's "couch of Typhon" was located "in a wooded place, in the fertile land of Hyde", with Hyde being another name for Sardis (or its acropolis), and that Demetrius of Scepsis (2nd century BC) thought that the Arimoi were most plausibly located "in the Katakekaumene country in Mysia". The 3rd-century BC poet Lycophron placed the lair of Typhons' mate Echidna in this region.

Another place, mentioned by Strabo as being associated with Arima, is the island of Ischia, where, according to Pherecydes of Athens, Typhon had fled and in the area where Pindar and others had said Typhon was buried. The connection to Arima comes from the Greek name Phlegraean Islands, which derives from the Greek word for monkey, and according to Strabo, residents of the island said that "arimoi" was also the Etruscan word for monkeys.

== In history ==
Assyrian kings and some scholars under this ethnonym meant the Arameans
