= Python (mythology) =

Serpent in Greek mythology

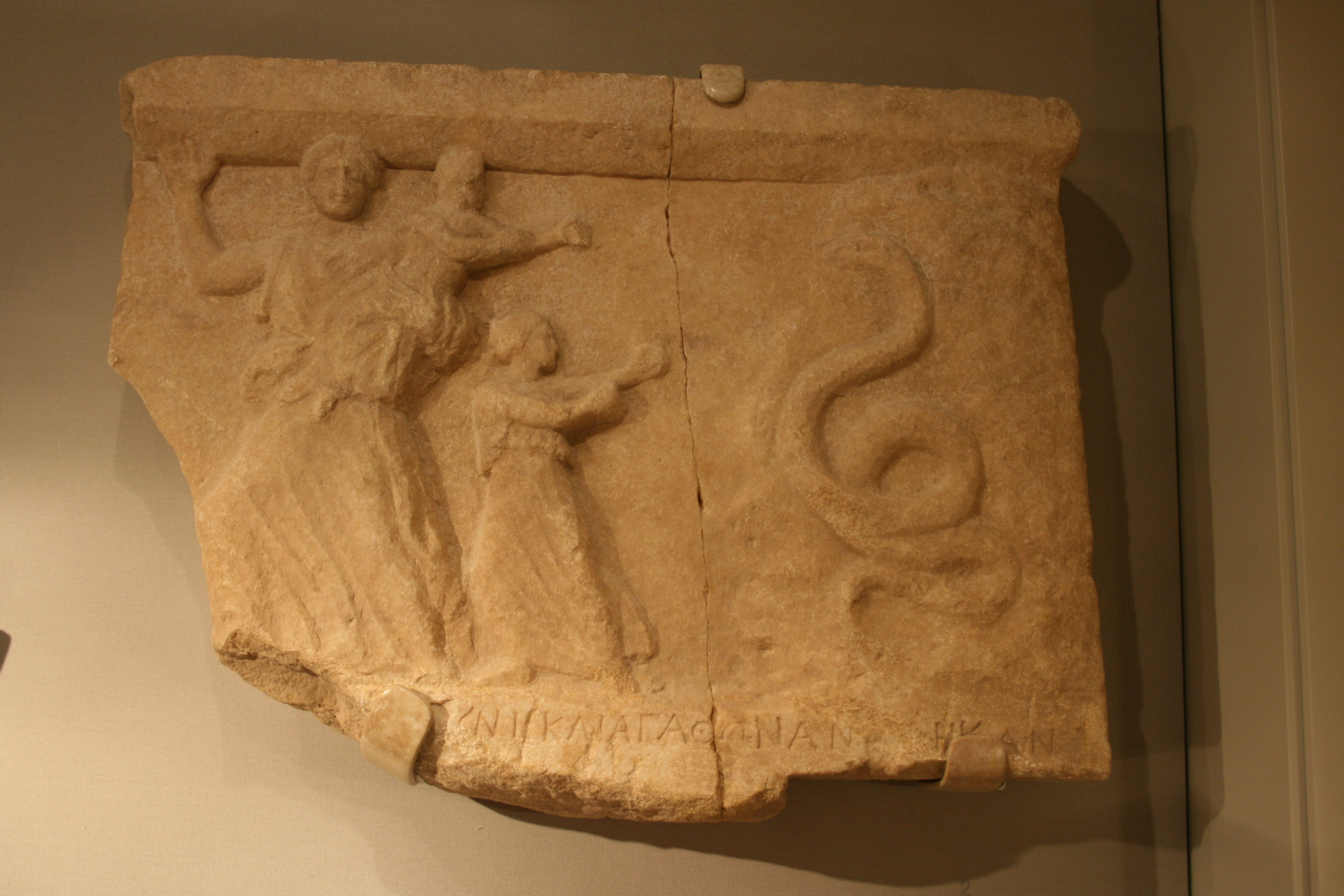
Relief of Leto and her children running away from Python, 4th-3rd century BC, Michael C. Carlos Museum.

In Greek mythology, Python (Ancient Greek: Πύθων; gen. Πύθωνος) was the serpent, sometimes represented as a medieval-style dragon, living at the center of the Earth, believed by the ancient Greeks to be at Delphi. He was killed by the god Apollo.

== Mythology ==
Python, sometimes written Pytho, presided at the Delphic oracle, which existed in the cult center for its mother, Gaia, "Earth", Pytho being the place name that was substituted for the earlier Krisa. Greeks considered the site to be the center of the Earth, represented by a stone, the omphalos or navel, which Python guarded.

Python became the chthonic enemy of the later Olympian deity Apollo, who slew it and took over Python's former home and oracle. These were the most famous and revered in the ancient Greek and Roman worlds. Like many monsters, Python was known as Gaia's son. In turn, Apollo had to eliminate him before he could establish a temple in Delphi.

== Versions and interpretations ==
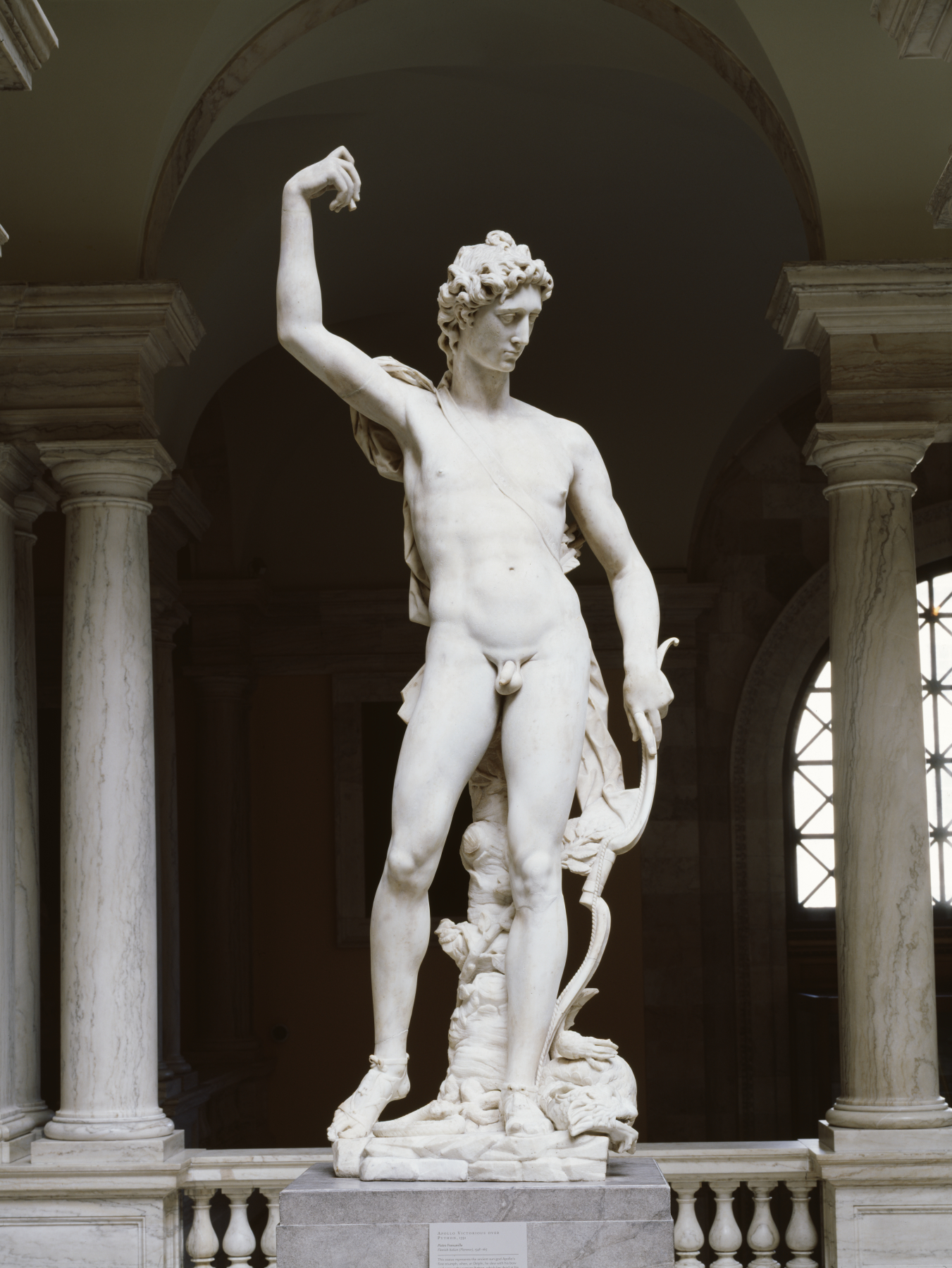
Sculpture by Pietro Francavilla of Apollo's first triumph, when he slew with his bow and arrows the serpent Python, which lies dead at his feet. The Walters Art Museum

There are various versions of Python's birth and death at the hands of Apollo. In the Homeric Hymn to Apollo, now thought to have been composed in 522 BC when the archaic period in Greek history was giving way to the Classical period, a small detail is provided regarding Apollo's combat with the serpent, in some sections identified as the deadly drakaina, or her parent. The god searching for a place to establish his shrine, reached Delphi and saw the Python, who was a bane to the people. He slew the serpent and declared himself as the owner of the Oracular shrine.

The version related by Hyginus holds that when Zeus lay with the goddess Leto, and she became pregnant with Artemis and Apollo, Hera was jealous and sent Python to pursue Leto throughout the lands, to prevent her from giving birth to the twin gods. Thus, when Apollo was born and was four days old he pursued Python, making his way straight for Mount Parnassus where the serpent dwelled and chased it to the oracle of Gaia at Delphi; there he dared to penetrate the sacred precinct and kill it with his arrows beside the rock cleft where the priestess sat on her tripod. Robert Graves, who habitually read into primitive myths a retelling of archaic political and social turmoil, saw in this the capture by Hellenes of a pre-Hellenic shrine. "To placate local opinion at Delphi," he wrote in The Greek Myths, "regular funeral games were instituted in honor of the dead hero Python, and her priestess was retained in office."

According to an epigram from 159 BC, it seems that Python in particular meant to rape Leto. (Note: The ambiguity here lies in the use of the verb chosen, σκυλάω (skuláō), alternative form of σκυλεύω (skuleúō), meaning το strip or despoil a slain enemy of his arms and gear, not entirely applicable to the myth of a mother fleeing from danger. Compare also σκυλλώ (skullṓ), meaning "to maltreat, to molest.") Clearchus of Soli wrote that while Python was pursuing them, Leto stepped on a stone and, holding Apollo in her hands, cried ἵε παῖ (híe paî, meaning "shoot, child") to him, who was holding a bow and arrows.

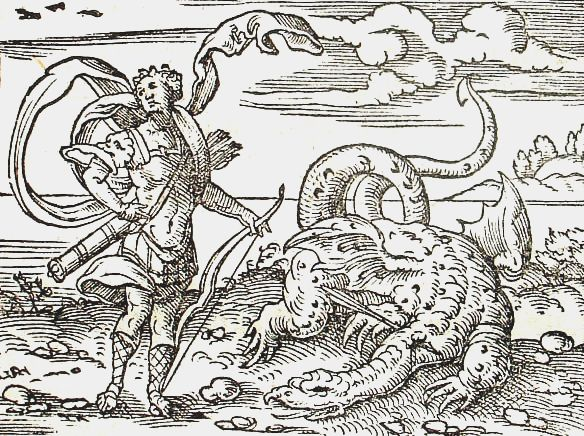
Apollo killing Python, 1581 engraving by Virgil Solis for Ovid's Metamorphoses, Book I.

The politics are conjectural, but the myth reports that Zeus ordered Apollo to purify himself for the sacrilege and instituted the Pythian Games, over which Apollo was to preside, as penance for his act.

Erwin Rohde wrote that the Python was an earth spirit, who was conquered by Apollo, and buried under the omphalos and that it is a case of one god setting up his temple on the grave of another.

The priestess of the oracle at Delphi became known as the Pythia, after the place-name Pytho, which Greeks explained as named after the rotting (πύθειν) of the slain serpent's corpse in the strength of Hyperion (day) or Helios (the sun).

Karl Kerenyi notes that in some early accounts Python is conflated with Typhon, the serpentine monster against whom Zeus fought. Other sources confuse him with the female dragon Delphyne; in these accounts, the dragon is said to be dissolved by the sun after its death.

Python was the good daemon (ἀγαθὸς δαίμων) of the temple as it appears in Minoan religion, but she was represented as a dragon, as often happens in Northern European folklore as well as in the East.

This myth has been described as an allegory for the dispersal of the fogs and clouds of vapor that arise from ponds and marshes (Python) by the rays of the Sun (the arrows of Apollo).

== See also ==
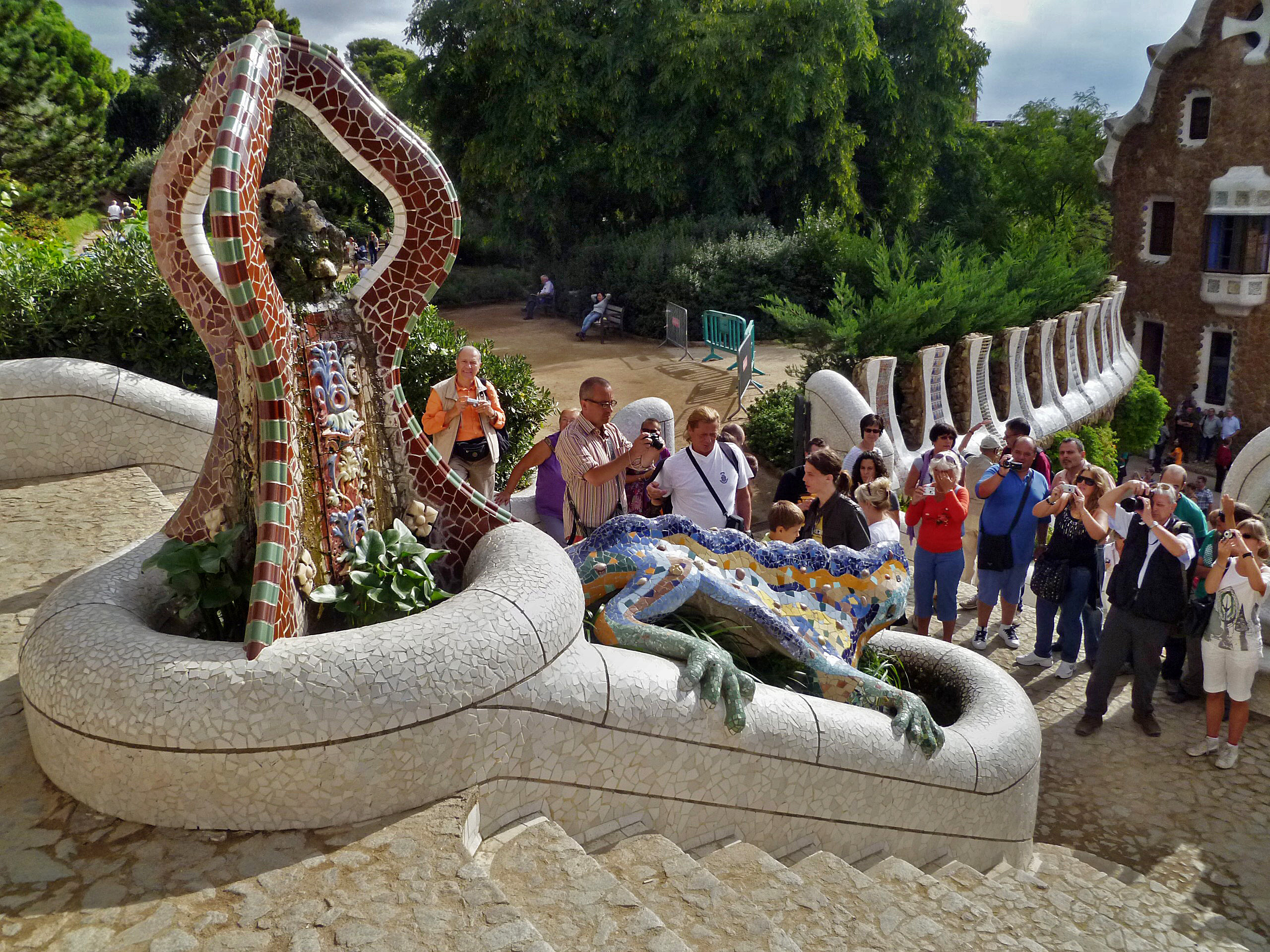
The Dragon (symbolizes Python, guardian of subterranean waters) in the Parc Güell, Barcelona, Spain

- Analogy of the Sun
- Apollo Belvedere
- Dragons in Greek mythology
- Pythia
- Python, a genus of the family Pythonidae, which the genus was named after
- Saint George and the Dragon
- Serpent (symbolism)
- Yamata no Orochi
