= Dragons in Greek mythology =

Snake-like monsters from Greek mythology

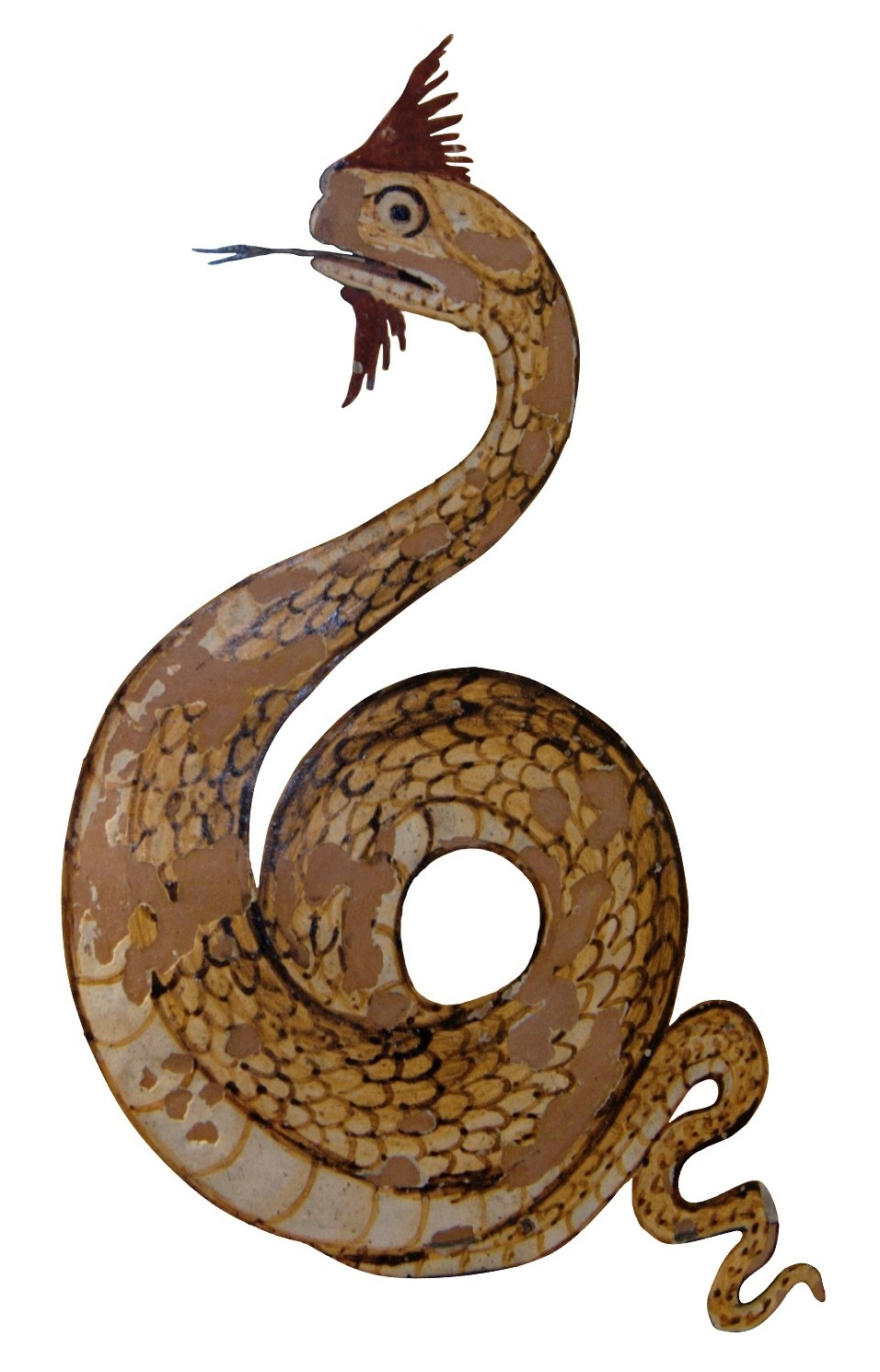
Depiction of the Ismenian dragon from a red-figured calix-krater found in Sant'Agata de' Goti (Campania), ca. 350–340 BC

Dragons (Greek: δράκοι) play a significant role in Greek mythology. Though the Greek drakōn often differs from the modern Western conception of a dragon, it is both the etymological origin of the modern term and by extension the source of many surviving Indo-European myths and legends about dragons.

== Origins ==
The word dragon derives from the Greek δράκων (drakōn) and its Latin descendant draco. Ancient Greeks applied the term to large, constricting snakes. The Greek drakōn was far more associated with poisonous spit or breath than the modern Western dragon, though fiery breath is still attested in a few myths. There is also the drakaina, the specifically female form or "she-dragon." The drakaina is occasionally treated differently from the more common masculine or gender-neutral drakōn, often surviving by mating with a hero or being the ancestress of an important lineage.

Daniel Ogden speaks of three ways to explain the origins of Greek dragon myths: as vertical evolution from (reconstructed) Proto-Indo-European mythology, as horizontal adaptation from Ancient Near Eastern mythology, or as sitting within "the cloud of international folktale". Regarding theories of horizontal transmission, Ogden argues that they carry "an unspoken assumption that prior to such a transfer the Greeks' own myth-world was a tabula rasa", which he calls absurd; only Typhon's Near Eastern origins are, in his view, plausible.

== List of dragons ==
=== Typhon ===
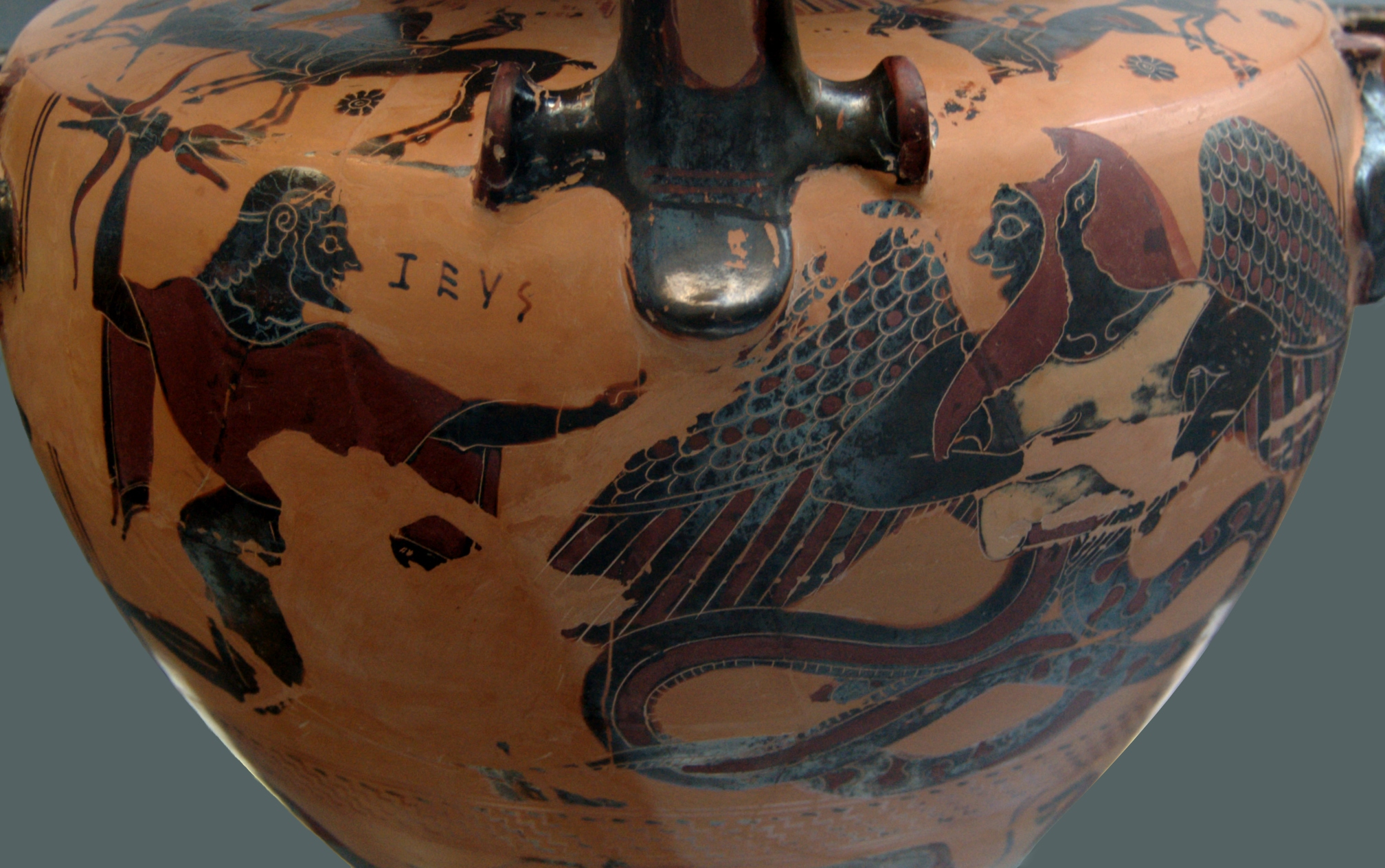
Zeus aiming his thunderbolt at a winged and snake-footed Typhon. Chalcidian black-figured hydria (c. 540–530 BC), Staatliche Antikensammlungen (Inv. 596).

Typhon was a fearsome monster of Greek mythology, the last son of Gaia. He is usually envisioned as humanoid from the waist up, serpentine below, almost the size of a mountain. With his mate Echidna, he would father many monsters. Later, he would attempt to overthrow Zeus for the title of ruler of the cosmos. Zeus would hurl an enormous rock on him to beat him. Typhon is a reptilian dragon with legs and wings, and he breathes fire from his mouth and eyes.

=== Ladon ===
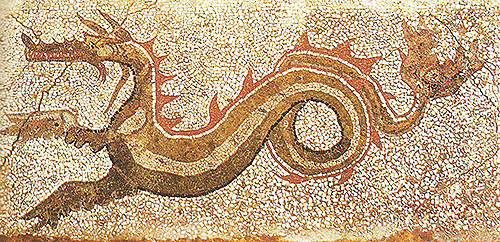
Mosaic of the third century BC from Kaulon (Magna Graecia, southern Italy)

Ladon was the serpent-like drakon (dragon, a word more commonly used) that twined round the tree in the Garden of the Hesperides and guarded the golden apples. Ladon was also said to have as many as one hundred heads. He was overcome and possibly slain by Heracles. After a few years, the Argonauts passed by the same spot, on their chthonic return journey from Colchis at the opposite end of the world, and heard the lament of "shining" Aigle, one of the Hesperides, and viewed the still-twitching Ladon (Argonautica, book iv). The creature is associated with the constellation Draco. Ladon was given several parentages, each of which placed him at an archaic level in Greek myth: the offspring of "Ceto, joined in love with Phorcys" (Hesiod, Theogony 333) or of Typhon, who was himself serpent-like from the waist down, and Echidna (Bibliotheke 2.113; Hyginus, Preface to Fabulae) or of Gaia herself, or in her Olympian manifestation, Hera: "The Dragon which guarded the golden apples was the brother of the Nemean lion," asserted Ptolemy Hephaestion (recorded in his New History V, lost but epitomized in Photius, Myriobiblion 190).

=== Lernaean Hydra ===
The Lernaean Hydra was a dragon-like water serpent with fatally venomous breath, blood and fangs, a daughter of Typhon and Echidna. The creature was said to have anywhere between five and 100 heads, although most sources put the number somewhere between seven and nine. For each head cut off, one or two more grew back in its place. It had an immortal head which would remain alive after it was cut off. Some accounts claim that the immortal head was made of gold. It lived in a swamp near Lerna and frequently terrorized the townsfolk until it was slain by Heracles, who cut the heads off, with the help of his nephew Iolaus, who then singed the oozing stump with a blazing firebrand to prevent any new heads from growing, as the second of his Twelve Labors. Hera sent a giant crab to distract Heracles, but he simply crushed it under his foot. Hera then placed it in the heavens as the constellation Cancer. After slaying the serpent, Heracles buried the immortal head under a rock and dipped his arrows in the creature's blood to make them fatal to his enemies. In one version, the poisoned arrows would eventually prove to be the undoing of his centaur tutor Chiron, who was placed in the heavens as the constellation Centaurus. In another version, he would never be able to use these arrows because of his fear of the poison spreading through the land and poisoning the water and crops.

=== Pytho or Python and Delphyne ===
In Greek mythology Python was the earth-dragon of Delphi, always represented in the vase-paintings and by sculptors as a serpent. Various myths represented Python as being either male or female (a drakaina). Python was the chthonic enemy of Apollo, who slew it and remade its former home his own oracle, the most famous in Greece. In some myths the dragon was called Delphyne. Delphyne was often pictured as being half girl and half snake.

There are various versions of Python's birth and death at the hands of Apollo. In the earliest, the Homeric Hymn to Apollo, little detail is given about Apollo's combat with the serpent or its parentage. The version related by Hyginus holds that when Zeus lay with the goddess Leto, and she was to deliver Artemis and Apollo, Hera sent Python to pursue her throughout the lands, so that she could not be delivered wherever the sun shone. Thus when the infant was grown he pursued the python, making his way straight for Mount Parnassus where the serpent dwelled, and chased it to the oracle of Gaia at Delphi, and dared to penetrate the sacred precinct and kill it with his arrows beside the rock cleft where the priestess sat on her tripod. The priestess of the oracle at Delphi became known as the Pythia, after the place-name Pytho, which was named after the rotting (πύθειν) of the serpent's corpse after it was slain.

=== The Colchian dragon ===
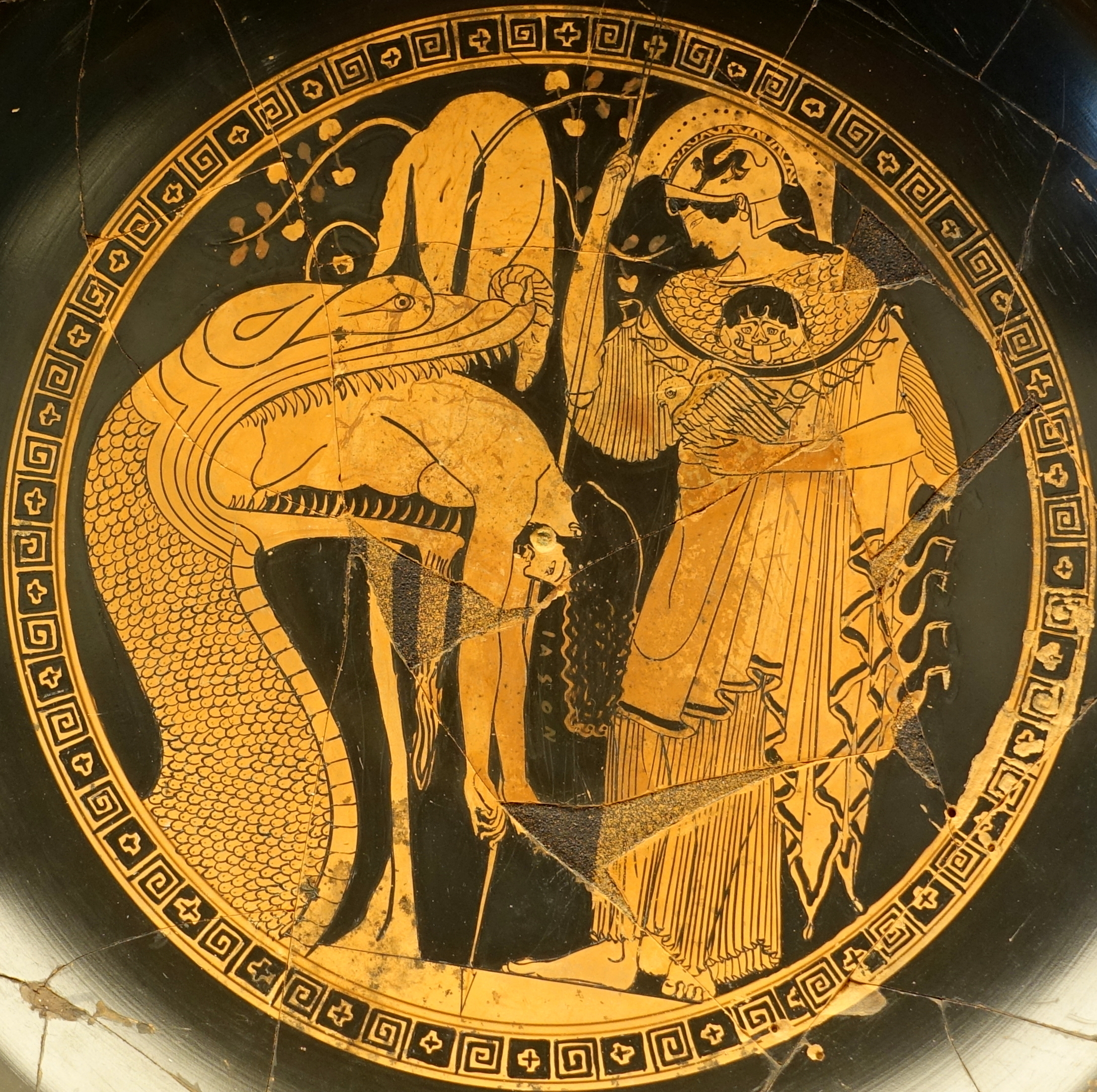
The Dragon protecting the fleece swallows Jason as Athena comes to the rescue. Attic red-figure kylix, c. 480-470 BC

Known as the Dragon of Colchis or the Colchian Dragon (Greek: Δρακων Κολχικος, Drakôn Kolkhikos), this immense serpent, a child of Typhon and Echidna, guarded the Golden Fleece at Colchis. It was said to never sleep, rest, or lower its vigilance. According to Ovid's Metamorphoses, the monster had a crest and three tongues. When Jason went to retrieve the Fleece, the witch Medea put the dragon to sleep with her magic and drugs, or perhaps Orpheus lulled it to sleep with his lyre. Afterwards, Medea herself had dragons pull her chariot.

=== Serpent of Ares ===
In the location where the city of Thebes would later be founded, a spring was protected by a serpent, assigned there by the god Ares. It was sometimes said to also be the offspring of Ares. It was encountered by the hero Cadmus, who defeated it using either his sword or a rock. On Athena's instruction, the hero planted the teeth of the dragon, from which arose the Spartoi, a group of armed men.

=== Helios' dragons ===
According to Apollodorus, the sun god Helios had a chariot, drawn by "winged dragons", which he gave to his granddaughter Medea.

=== Scythian Dracaena ===
She was a woman from the waist up with a serpent's tail in place of legs. When Heracles was traveling through Scythia with the cattle of Geryon, she stole some of the herd when the hero was sleeping. When Heracles woke he searched for them, visiting every part of the country, and he came to the land called the Hylaea (Ancient Greek: Ὑλαίη), and there he found in a cave the creature, which was the queen of that country. She insisted the hero mate with her before she would return them. He did so and through her became the ancestor of an ancient line of Scythian kings. It may have identified with the Echidna.

=== Gigantomachy Dragon ===
A dragon that was thrown at Athena during the Gigantomachy. She threw it into the sky where it became the constellation Draco.

=== Trojan Dragons ===
Two huge sea-serpents from Tenedos sent by various gods to kill Laocoön and his sons in order to stop him from telling his people that the Wooden Horse was a trap.

== See also ==
- European dragon
- Drakaina
- Dragons in Manipuri mythology
- Germanic dragon
