= Delphyne =

Monster in Greek mythology

In Greek mythology, Delphyne (Ancient Greek: Δελφύνη, romanized: Delphúnē) is the name given, by some accounts, to the monstrous serpent killed by Apollo at Delphi. Although, in Hellenistic and later accounts, the Delphic monster slain by Apollo is usually said to be the male serpent Python, in the earliest known account of this story, the Homeric Hymn to Apollo (6th century BC), the god kills a nameless she-serpent (drakaina), subsequently called Delphyne. According to the Suda, Delphi was named after Delphyne.

== Mythology ==
The Homeric Hymn describes the serpentess as "the bloated, great she-dragon, a fierce monster wont to do great mischief to men upon earth, to men themselves and to their thin-shanked sheep; for she was a very bloody plague", and says that "whosoever met the dragoness, the day of doom would sweep him away". According to the Hymn, she was the foster mother of the serpentine monster Typhon, who was given to the dragoness, "an evil to an evil" (κακῷ κακόν), by his mother Hera. Typhon was to eventually battle Zeus for supremacy of the cosmos. The Hymn goes on to describe how, while building his oracular temple at Delphi, Apollo encountered the she-serpent near a "sweet flowing spring". Apollo shot the dragoness with an arrow from his bow, and the monster:

rent with bitter pangs, lay drawing great gasps for breath and rolling about that place. An awful noise swelled up unspeakable as she writhed continually this way and that amid the wood: and so she left her life, breathing it forth in blood.

Apollonius of Rhodes (early 3rd century BC), says that Apollo "slew with his bow the monster Delphyne", "beneath the rocky ridge of Parnassus", and that the victory was cheered by the "Corycian nymphs", who were associated with the Corycian cave on the slopes of Parnassus above Delphi. Plutarch (c. 46 AD – 120 AD), refers to the monster who "fought with Apollo for the oracle at Delphi" as female, and says that although it was recorded that at one time the oracle at Delphi was made "desolate and unapproachable" by a dragoness, in fact, "it was the desolation that attracted the creature rather than that the creature caused the desolation". Delphyne also appears in Apollodorus' account (1st or 2nd century AD) of Typhon's battle with Zeus, where she is called both a "she-dragon" (drakaina) and a "half-bestial maiden". According to Apollodorus, Typhon managed to cut away Zeus' sinews from his body. Typhon then hid the severed tendons in the Corycian cave in Cilicia (a different cave than the one above Delphi), and set the dragoness Delphyne, to guard over them. The (2nd-century AD?) geographical poet Dionysius Periegetes mentions a coil of the serpent Delphyne leaning against Apollo's sacrificial tripod. Nonnus in his Dionysiaca says that Apollo first killed Delphyne and then he went to live at Olympus.

Delphyne shares several similarities with Typhon's mate, the monstrous Echidna. Like Apollodorus' Delphyne, Echidna was half-maid and half-snake, and both were a "plague" (πῆμα) to men. Both were also intimately connected to Typhon, and associated with the Corycian cave.

== Name ==
The name Delphyne means "womb" (δελφύς), and probably arose by back-formation from Delphi. Other related forms of the name: Delphyna (female) and Delphynes (male), were, apparently, also used for the Delphian dragon. For example, according to the 7th-century chronicler John of Antioch, some said the Pythian Games were held in honor of the male serpent Delphynes, while others said the heroine (hêrôis) Delphyne.
