= Mount of the Congregation =

The Mount of the Congregation in the Old Testament (Isaiah 14:13), has been supposed to refer to the place where God met with angels in the uttermost north of the 3rd Heaven, first and second heavens being Earth's atmosphere and outerspace respectively (2 Corinthians 2:12; Nehemiah 9:6) i.e., the mount of the Divine presence. This position is agreed upon by various Biblical commentators, from Rashi to Matthew Henry.

== See also ==
- Mount Meru
- Mount Olympus
