= Jebel Aqra =

Mountain on the Syria–Turkey border

- جبل الأقرع
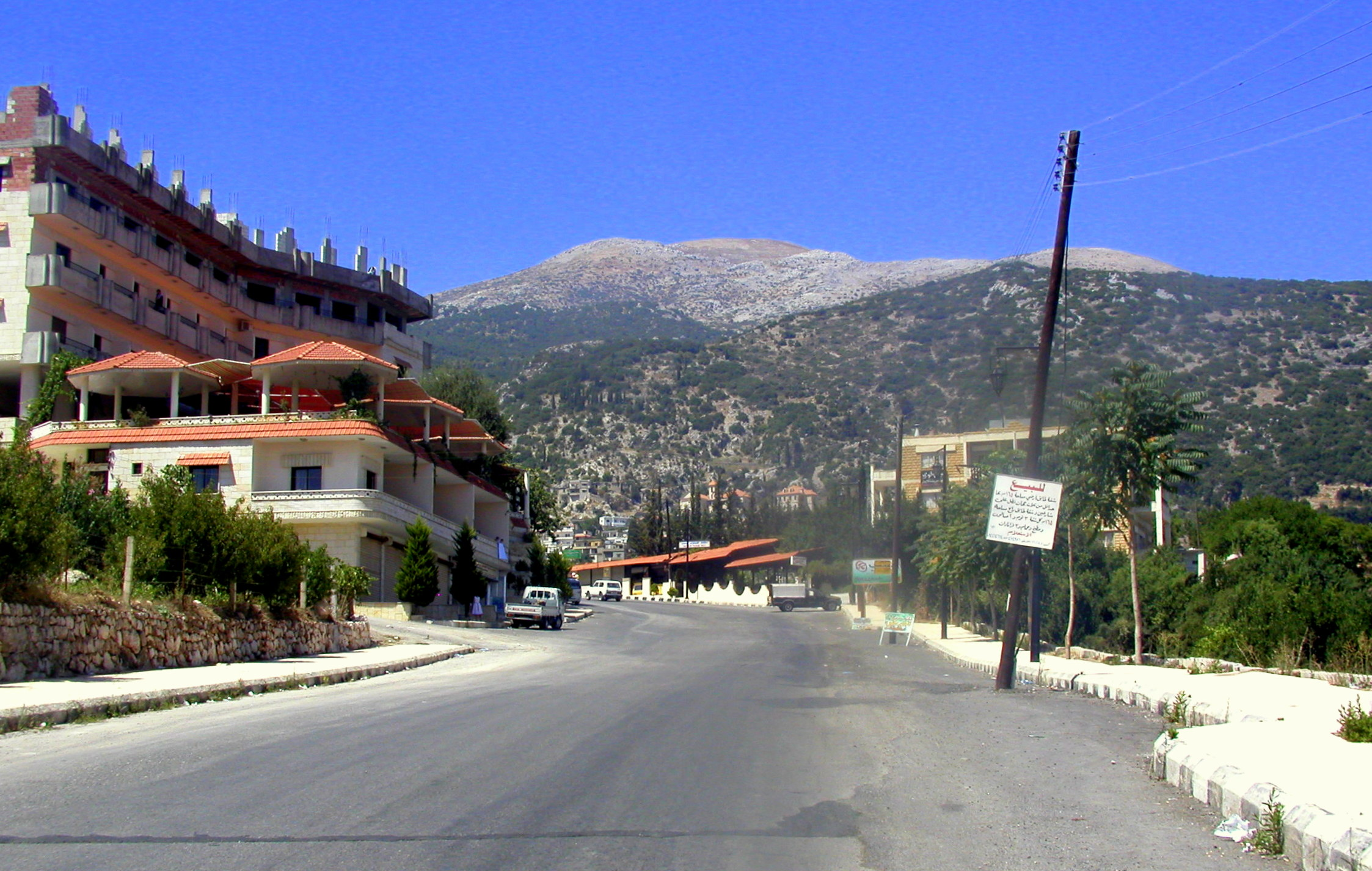
- Jebel Aqra overlooking the town of Kessab

Highest point
- Elevation: 1,728 m (5,669 ft)
- Prominence: 1,276 m (4,186 ft)
- Listing: Ribu
- Coordinates: 35°57′9″N 35°58′9.5″E

Geography
- Location within Syria
- Location: Latakia Governorate, Kesab, Syria; Hatay Province, Turkey

Jebel Aqra (Arabic: جبل الأقرع, romanized: Jabal al-ʾAqraʿ, [ˈd͡ʒæbæl al ˈʔaqraʕ]; Turkish: Kel Dağı) is a limestone mountain located on the Syrian–Turkish border near the mouth of the Orontes River on the Mediterranean Sea. Rising from a narrow coastal plain, Jebel Aqra is a mariners' landmark that gathers thunderstorms.

The mountain was a cult site in ancient Canaanite religion and continuing through classical antiquity. A mound of ash and debris remains; an archaeological investigation was broken off because of military restrictions imposed due to the mountain's border location.

== Names ==
The ancient Semitic name of the mountain, Ṣapōn, is recorded in Akkadian as Ṣapūna (𒍝𒁍𒈾), Ugaritic as Ṣapunu (𐎕𐎔𐎐), Egyptian as ḏꜣpwnꜣ (𓍑𓄿𓊪𓏲𓈖𓐰𓄿𓐱𓌙𓈉, 𓍑𓄿𓊪𓐱𓏲𓐰𓈖𓄿𓐱𓌙𓐰𓈉), Aramaic as Ṣapōn (𐡑𐡐𐡍, 𐡑𐡐𐡅𐡍), Phoenician as Ṣapōn (𐤑𐤐𐤍), and Hebrew as Ṣāp̄ōn (צָפוֹן).

The Hurrians and the Hittites both called the mountain Ḫazzi (𒄯𒊕𒄩𒊍𒍣), which was a name also used for it in early Akkadian texts. The Hurro-Hittite name gave rise to the mountain's Ancient Greek name of Kasios (Κάσιος) and its Latin name Casius.

Zaphon, like Mizpah and Mizpeh, is derived from a noun meaning lookout point.

== History ==
Jebel Aqra has a long history as a sacred mountain.

The Hurrians called it Mount Hazzi and considered it the home of their storm god Teshub. The Hittites continued his worship, celebrating Teshub's victory over the sea in the Song of Kumarbi found in their capital Hattusa. (Note: Lane Fox, quoting Rutherford.) They also celebrated the mountain in its own right, naming it as a divine guarantor on their treaties and observing rites in its honor.

The ancient port of Ugarit (modern Ras Shamra) lies 30 kilometers (19 mi) to its south. Texts discovered there in the 1920s, including the Baal Cycle, showed its residents considered the peak of Mount Sapan to house the lapis and silver palace of their storm god Baʿal (lit. 'The Lord') and his sister ʿAnat. Baʿal is now often identified with Hadad and his variations understood as local cults. The form Baʿal Zephon was worshipped widely: his temple at Ugarit held a sandstone relief dedicated to him by a royal scribe in Egypt and the king of Tyre called on him as a divine witness on a treaty with the emperor of Assyria in 677 BCE.

It appears in the Hebrew Scriptures as Mount Zaphon (Hebrew: צפון Tsāfōn). (Note: Bar Daroma claimed it as the northern Mount Hor (Hebrew: הר ההר) mentioned in the Book of Numbers, although this is more often taken to refer to Turkey's Nur Mountains.) In ancient Canaanite religion, Mount Sapan was sometimes accounted as the home of all the gods, not only Baʿal and his sister. As Mount Zaphon, it appears in that role in the Hebrew Scriptures' Book of Isaiah, along with the Mount of the Congregation. From its importance and its position at the northern end of Canaan, it also became a metonym and then the word for the direction "north" in the Hebrew language.

Under various forms, worship continued through antiquity, when it was called Mount Casius (Ancient Greek: Κασιος, Kasios; Latin: Casius Mons; Armenian: Կասիոս Լեռ, Gassios Ler) and lay 10 kilometers (6.2 mi) north of Posideium (modern Ras al-Bassit). Even closer, the earliest Hellenic foothold in the Levant lies at the beach on its northern flank at Al Mina. Here Euboeans and Cypriotes experienced some of their earliest on-site experience of northwest Semitic cultures, from the early eighth century BCE onwards. "The Hittite name persisted in neo-Hittite culture into the ninth century [BCE] and so when Greeks settled on the north side of Mount Hazzi they continued to call its main peak 'Mount Kasios'", Lane Fox points out, observing that it was the Mount Olympus of the Near East.

The cult of the god of the mountain was transferred, by interpretatio graeca, to Zeus Kasios, the "Zeus of Mount Kasios", similar to Ras Kouroun in the Sinai. Tiles from the Greco-Roman sanctuary at the site, stamped with the god's name, were reused in the Christian monastery that came to occupy the eastern, landward slopes of Kazios.

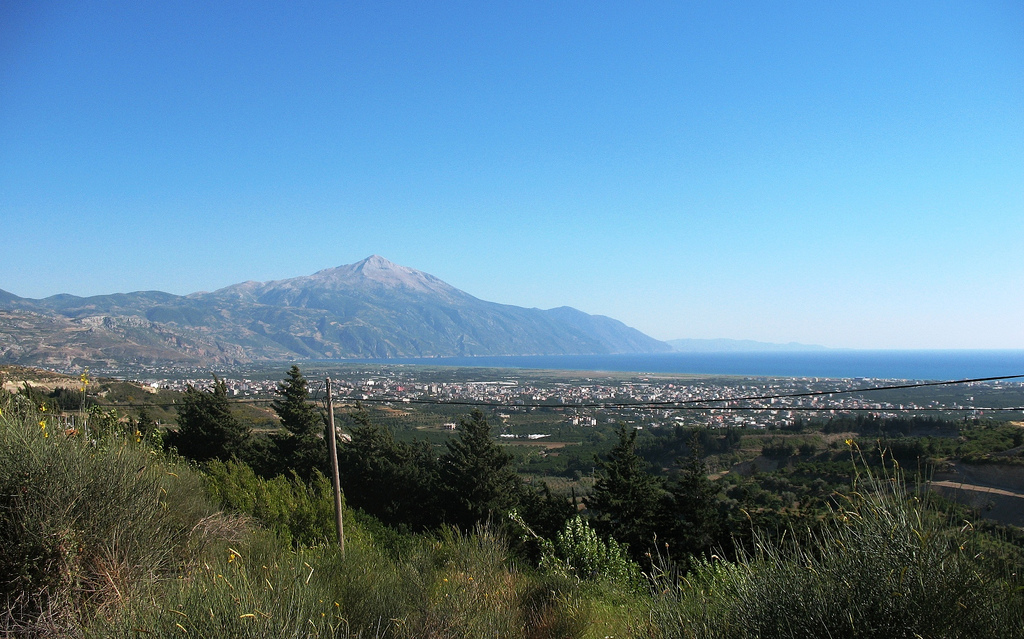
Jebel Aqra as seen from Samandağ

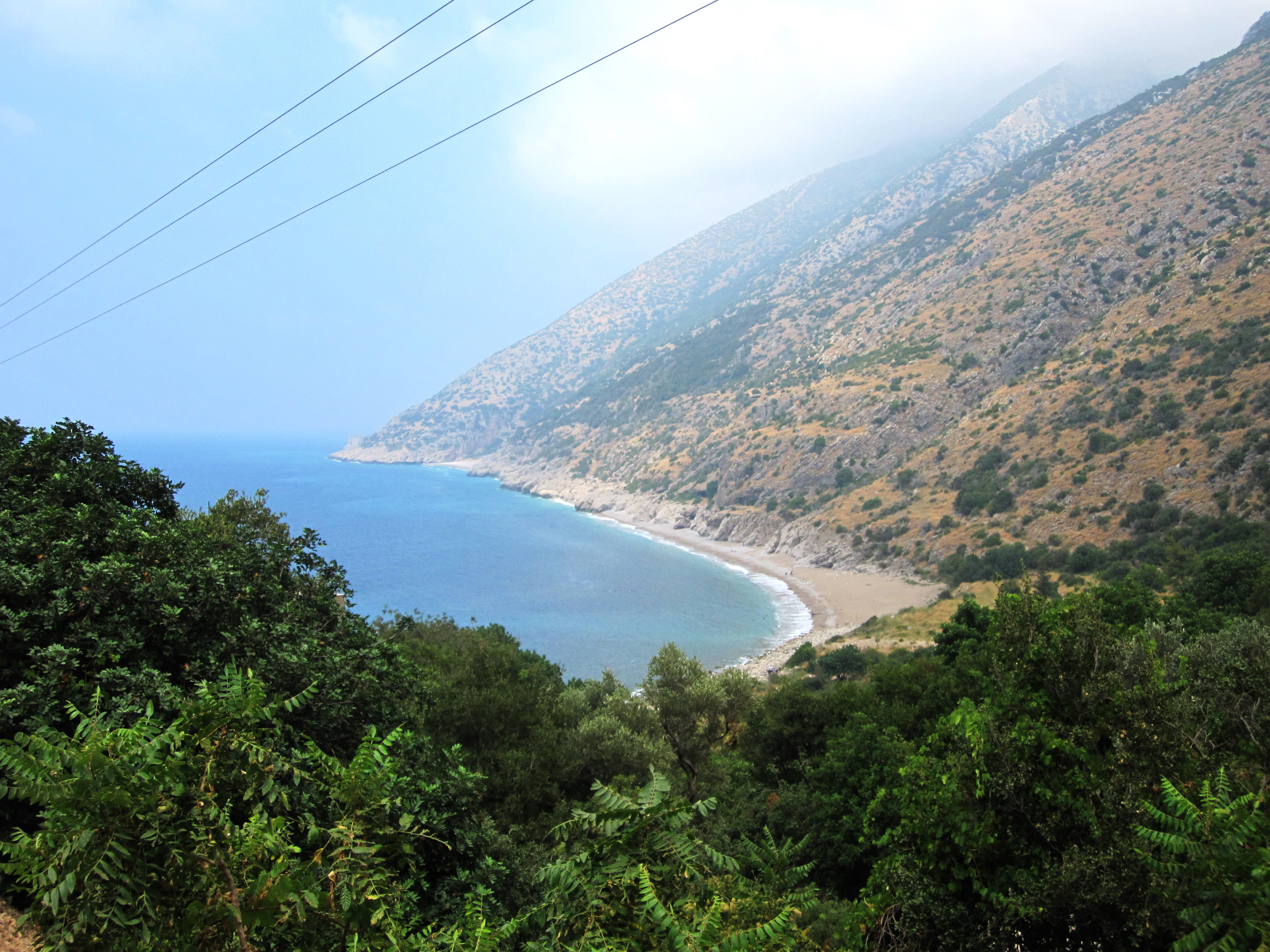
The slopes of Jebel Aqra along the Syria-Turkey borderline on the Mediterranean Sea

When kings and emperors climbed Mount Kasios to sacrifice at its peak sanctuary, it was a notable cultural occasion. Seleucus I Nicator sought there the advice of Zeus in locating his foundation, a Seleuceia (one of many) on the coast. Coins struck there as late as the first century BCE still show the city's emblem, the thunderbolt, sometimes placed upon the cushion of a throne. In the winter of 114/15 CE Trajan was spared in a major earthquake that struck Antioch; commemorative coins were struck featuring the shrine of Zeus Kasios, with its pointed roof on pillars, and a representation of its rounded sacred stone, or betyl. Trajan's adoptive son Hadrian accompanied him; he returned in 130 AD to scale the mountain at night, no doubt, Lane Fox remarks, to witness the rising of the sun, visible for several minutes from the peak, while the land below lay still in darkness; it was said later that a thunderbolt at the peak struck the animal he was about to sacrifice. In spring 363 the last pagan emperor, Julian, scaled the mountain, where he had an epiphanic vision of Zeus Kasios, according to his friend and correspondent Libanius.

Greek theophoric names Kassiodora and Kassiodorus, equally a "gift of Kasios", recall a vow of one or both parents made to ensure fertile conception.

Christian hermits were drawn to the mountain; Barlaam challenged its demons by founding a monastery near the treeline on its eastern slopes, and Simeon Stylites the Younger stood for forty years on a pillar near its northern flanks until his death in 592.

The cult site is represented by a huge mound of ashes and debris, 180 feet (55 m) wide and 26 feet (7.9 m) deep, of which only the first 6 feet (1.8 m) have been excavated. Archaeologists only reached as far as the Hellenistic strata before the site was closed, as it lies in a Turkish military zone on its border with Syria. The remains are presumed to have been destroyed following the construction of a Turkish military base on the summit in 2012.
