= Drakaina (mythology) =

Serpents from Greek mythology

In Greek mythology, a drakaina (Ancient Greek: δράκαινα, Latinized dracaena) is a female serpent or dragon, sometimes with humanlike features.

== Mythology ==
The earliest representations of Delphyne are shown as simply gigantic serpents, similar to other Greek dragons. However, although the word "drakaina" is literally the feminine form of drakon (Ancient Greek for dragon or serpent), most drakainas had some features of a human woman. Lamia, Campe, Echidna, and many representations of Ceto, Scylla, and Delphyne had the head and torso of a woman. Medusa is also mentioned as a drakaina while also emphasizing her human aspects; rather than a drakaina alone, it has been argued that she is a woman who has been fused with a dragon.
