= Acusilaus =

Ancient Greek logographer

Acusilaus, Acusilas, Acousileos, or Akousilaos (Ancient Greek: Ἀκουσίλαος) of Argos, son of Cabas or Scabras, was a Greek logographer and mythographer who lived in the latter half of the 6th century BC but whose work survives only in fragments and summaries of individual points. He is one of the authors (= FGrHist 2) whose fragments were collected in Felix Jacoby's Die Fragmente der griechischen Historiker.

Acusilaus was called the son of Cabras or Scabras, and it is not known whether he was of Peloponnesian or Boeotian Argos. Possibly there were two of the name. He is reckoned by some among the Seven Sages of Greece.

According to the Suda, Acusilaus wrote genealogies (c. 500 BC). Three books of his genealogies are quoted, which were for the most part only a translation of Hesiod into prose. Acusilaus claimed to have taken some of his information from bronze tablets discovered in his garden which were inscribed with information, a source looked upon with suspicion by some modern commentators. As with most of the other logographers, he wrote in the Ionic dialect. Plato is the earliest writer by whom he is mentioned. The works which bore the name of Acusilaus in a later age were spurious.
