= Elyon =

Honorific title of Jewish God

Elyon or El Elyon (Hebrew: אֵל עֶלְיוֹן ʼĒl ʻElyōn), is an epithet that appears in the Hebrew Bible and in other ancient writings. ʾĒl ʿElyōn is usually rendered in English as "God Most High", and similarly in the Septuagint as ὁ Θεός ὁ ὕψιστος ("God the highest"). The title ʿElyōn is a common topic of scholarly debate, sometimes interpreted as equivalent to the Abrahamic God, and otherwise theorized as a reference to a separate deity of its own kind, potentially above that of Yahweh.

Outside the biblical context, the term elyon also has mundane uses, such as "upper" (where the ending in both roots is a locative, not superlative or comparative), "top", or "uppermost", referring simply to the position of objects (e.g. it is applied to a basket in Genesis 40:17, and to a chamber in Ezekiel 42:5).

== Hebrew Bible ==
=== ʼĒl ʻElyōn ===
The compound name ʼĒl ʻElyōn, God Most High, can be found in Genesis 14:18–20, referring to the God whose priest was Melchizedek, king of Salem. The form appears again almost immediately in verse 22, used by Abraham in an oath spoken to the king of Sodom. In verse 22, the name of God also occurs in apposition to ʼĒl ʻElyōn in the Masoretic Text but it is absent in the Samaritan version, in the Septuagint translation, and in Symmachus. Its occurrence here was one foundation of a theory first espoused by Julius Wellhausen that ʼĒl ʻElyōn was an ancient god of Salem (Jerusalem), later equated with God. The only other occurrence of the compound expression is in Psalm 78:35: "And they remembered that God [ʼĒlōhīm] was their rock, and the high God [ʼĒl ʻElyōn] their redeemer." The name is repeated later in the same Psalm, but with a variation: verse 56 says ʼElohim ʻElyōn.

It has been suggested that the reference to "ʼĒl ʻElyōn, maker of heaven and earth" in Genesis 14:19 and 22 reflects a Canaanite background. The phrasing in Genesis resembles a retelling of Canaanite religious traditions in Philo of Byblos's account of Phoenician history, in which ʻElyōn was the progenitor of Ouranos ("Sky") and Gaia ("Earth").

=== ʽElyōn ===
The name ʽElyōn (Most High) standing alone is found in many poetic passages, especially in the Psalms. It appears in Balaam's verse oracle in Numbers 24:16 as a separate name parallel to Ēl. It also appears in Moses' final song in Deuteronomy 32:8 (a much-discussed verse). A translation of the Masoretic text:

When the Most High (ʽElyōn) divided nations,
he separated the sons of man (Ādām);
he set the bounds of the masses
according to the number of the sons of Israel

Many Septuagint manuscripts have angelōn theou (angels of God) in place of "sons of Israel", while a few others have huiōn theou (sons of God). The Dead Sea Scrolls fragment 4QDeut^{j}, however, reads bny ’lwhm, (sons of God, or sons of ’Elohim). The New Revised Standard Version translates this as "he fixed the boundaries ... according to the number of the gods." However, the identification of ʽElyōn in the passage is disputed.

This passage appears to identify ʽElyōn with ’Elohim, but not necessarily with Yahweh. It can be read to mean that ʽElyōn separated mankind into 70 nations according to his 70 sons (the 70 sons of Ēl being mentioned in the Ugaritic texts), each of these sons to be the tutelary deity over one of the 70 nations, one of them being the God of Israel, Yahweh. Alternatively, it may mean that ʽElyōn, having given the other nations to his sons, now takes Israel for himself under the name of the Tetragrammaton. Both interpretations have support, although viewing ʽElyōn as a higher deity than Yahweh may be against most monotheistic standards of modern Abrahamic dogmas.

Michael Heiser argues that separating El and Yahweh is 'internally inconsistent' within the Book of Deuteronomy (e.g. Deuteronomy 4:19–20, Deuteronomy 32:6–7). According to Heiser, it also raises the question on why the Deuteronomists would be so careless to introduce this error, especially a few verses later, and why they didn't quickly remove them as 'intolerant monotheists'.

In Isaiah 14:13–14, ʽElyōn is used in a very mystical context in the passage providing the basis for later speculation on the fall of Satan where the rebellious prince of Babylon is pictured as boasting:

I shall be enthroned in the mount of the council in the farthest north [or farthest Zaphon]
I will ascend above the heights of the clouds;
I will be like the Most High.

In some cases, ʽElyōn is used in reference to Yahweh, such as in Psalm 97:9:

For you, Lord [YHWH],
are Most High [ʽelyōn] over all the earth;
you are raised high over all the gods.

== Non-biblical use ==
The epithet "Most High" occurs on several occasions in non-biblical texts:

=== Sefire I Treaty ===
The most controversial of these texts is in the earliest of three Aramaic treaty inscriptions found at al-Safirah, 16 miles (26 km) southeast of Aleppo.

The "Sefire I" inscription (KAI 222.I.A.8–12; ANET p. 659), which dates to about 750 BCE, lists the major patron deities of each side, all of them in pairs coupled by "and", in each case a male god and the god's spouse when the names are known. Then, after a gap comes ’l wʽlyn

- This possibly means "’Ēl and ʽElyōn", seemingly also two separate gods, followed by further pairs of deities.
- It is possible also that these indicate two aspects of the same god.
- It might be a single divine name. The Ugaritic texts contain divine names like Kothar waḪasis "Skillful-and-Clever", Mot waShar "Death-and-Prince" (or possibly "Death-and-Destruction'), Nikkal-and-Ib, which is in origin the name of the Sumerian goddess Ningal combined with an element of unknown meaning. Therefore, Ēl waʽElyōn might be a single name 'God-and-Highest' identical in meaning with Biblical ʼĒl ʽElyōn, even though this would be unique.

Frank Moore Cross (1973) accepts all three interpretations as possibilities.

=== Sanchuniathon ===
In Eusebius' account of Philo of Byblos' (c. 64–141 CE) record of Sanchuniathon's euhemeristic account of the Phoenician deities, Elioun, whom he calls Hypsistos, the highest, and who is therefore likely ʿElyōn, is quite separate from his Elus/Cronus, who is the supreme god Ēl. Sanchuniathon tells only:

In their time is born a certain Elioun called "the Most High," and a female named Beruth, and these dwelt in the neighbourhood of Byblos. And from them is born Epigeius or Autochthon, whom they afterwards called Sky; so that from him they named the element above us Sky because of the excellence of its beauty. And he has a sister born of the aforesaid parents, who was called Earth, and from her, he says, because of her beauty, they called the earth by the same name. And their father, the Most High, died in an encounter with wild beasts, and was deified, and his children offered to him libations and sacrifices.

According to Sanchuniathon it is from Sky and Earth that Ēl and various other deities are born, though ancient texts refer to Ēl as creator of heaven and earth. The Hittite theogony knows of a primal god named Alalu who fathered Sky (and possibly Earth) and who was overthrown by his son Sky, who was in turn overthrown by his son Kumarbi. A similar tradition seems to be at the basis of Sanchuniathon's account.

As to Beruth who is here ʿElyōn's wife, a relationship with Hebrew b^{ə}rīt 'covenant' or with the city of Beirut have both been suggested.

=== Hasmonean dynasty ===
The Mishnah recounts that Hasmonean rulers used to identify themselves as "High Priest of El Elyon": "When the Hasmonean kingdom became strong and defeated the Greeks, they instituted that people should mention the name of Heaven even in their legal documents. And therefore they would write: In year such and such of Yoḥanan the High Priest of the God Most High." Scholars have observed that the Hasmoneans used Melchizedek's example of monarch-priest to justify occupying both offices.

== See also ==
- Al-Ala
- El
- Enlil
- Helios
- The Hypsistarians, worshippers of the Most High God (Theos Hypsistos), were a distinct non-Jewish monotheistic sect which flourished in Asia Minor and Greece from about 200 BC to about AD 400.
- Illiyin
- Shangdi
- Names of God in Judaism
