= El (deity) =

Northwest Semitic supreme deity

El 𐎛𐎍
- Father of the gods
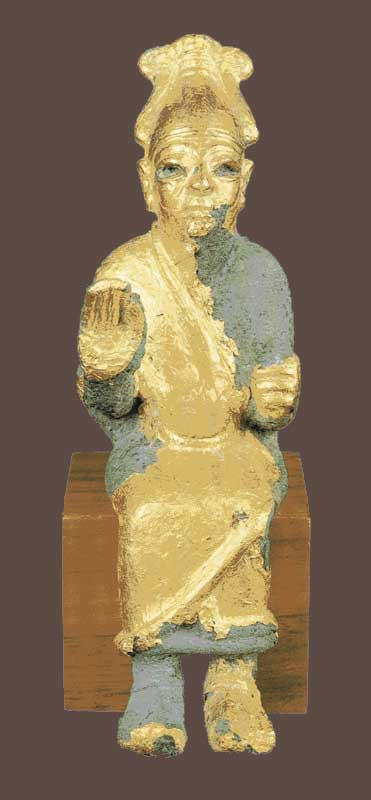
- Gilded statuette of El from Ugarit
- Other names: Adon Ilim ("Lord of the gods")
- Venerated in: Ancient Semitic religion
- Abode: Mount Lel
- Planet: Saturn
- Symbol: Bull
- Region: Levant (particularly Canaan) and Anatolia

Genealogy
- Consort: Asherah/Athirat; Other wives
- Children: Anat; Ashtar; Baal; Mot; Shahar; Shalim; Shapash; Yahweh (tentative, period dependent); Yam (Ugarit religions); Athtart?; Hadad?; 70 sons in total

Equivalents
- Syrian: Dagon (tentative)
- Mesopotamian: Anu, Enlil
- Hurrian: Kumarbi
- Roman: Saturn
- Greek: Cronus, Poseidon

El (Note: /ɛl/, EL; also 'Il, Ugaritic: 𐎛𐎍 ʾīlu; Phoenician: 𐤀𐤋 ʾīl; Hebrew: אֵל ʾēl; Syriac: ܐܺܝܠ ʾīyl; Arabic: إل ʾil or إله ʾilāh; cognate to Akkadian: 𒀭 ilu) is a Northwest Semitic word meaning 'god' or 'deity', or referring (as a proper name) to any one of multiple major ancient Near Eastern deities. A rarer form, 'ila, represents the predicate form in the Old Akkadian and Amorite languages. The word is derived from the Proto-Semitic *ʔil-.

Originally a Canaanite deity known as 'El, 'Al or 'Il was the supreme god of the ancient Canaanite religion. Some scholars like Ignace Gelb and Frank Moore Cross speculate he may have also been the supreme god of East Semitic speakers in the Early Dynastic Period of Mesopotamia (c. 2900 – c. 2350 BCE). Among the Hittites, El was known as Elkunirša (Hittite: 𒂖𒆪𒉌𒅕𒊭 Elkunīrša). Although El gained different appearances and meanings in different languages over time, it continues to exist as El-, -il or -el in compound proper noun phrases such as Elizabeth, Israel, Michael, and Bethel, most of which are theophoric given names.

El is often described as the father of the gods and the creator of humanity. El had many epithets, including "Bull El," "El the King," and "Father of Mankind," reflecting his authority, wisdom, and paternal role. One of many models proposes that over time, in Israelite religion, Yahweh absorbed many of El’s characteristics, gradually merging their identities through a process scholar Francesca Stavrakopoulou called "pantheon reduction".

In Ugaritic and Levantine mythology, El presided over a council of gods and fathered major deities like Baal, Yam, and Mot. He was depicted as wise and kingly, yet occasionally vulnerable, complementing Baal's role as a sustaining warrior. Archaeological texts show El's association with eternity, creation, and divine authority, often with a consort similar to Asherah. Later sources, including Phoenician and Hellenistic writings, sometimes equated El with other deities such as Cronus or Poseidon.

== Linguistic forms and meanings ==
Cognate forms of El are found throughout the Semitic languages. They include Ugaritic ʾilu, pl. ʾlm; Phoenician ʾl pl. ʾlm; Hebrew ʾēl, pl. ʾēlîm; Aramaic ʾl; Akkadian ilu, pl. ilānu.

In Northwest Semitic use, ʼel was a generic word for any god as well as the special name or title of a particular god who was distinguished from other gods as being "the god". El is listed at the head of many pantheons. In some Canaanite and Ugaritic sources, El played a role as father of the gods, of creation, or both.

As the word el sometimes refers to a god other than the named deity El, it is frequently ambiguous as to whether El followed by another name means the god El with a particular epithet applied or refers to another god entirely. For example, in the Ugaritic texts, ʾil mlk is understood to mean "El the King" but ʾil hd as "the god Hadad".

The Semitic root ʾlh (Arabic ʾilāh', Aramaic ʾAlāh, ʾElāh, Hebrew ʾelōah) may be ʾl with a parasitic h, and ʾl may be an abbreviated form of ʾlh. In Ugaritic the plural form meaning 'gods' is ʾilhm, equivalent to Hebrew ʾǝlōhim 'gods; divinity'. In the Hebrew texts, this word is interpreted as being semantically singular for "god" by biblical commentators. The documentary hypothesis theorizes that at least four different authors – the Jahwist (J), Elohist (E), Deuteronomist (D), and Priestly (P) sources – were responsible for editing stories from a polytheistic religion into those of a monotheistic religion, and that these sources were joined together at various points in time by a series of editors or "redactors". Some believe inconsistencies that arise between monotheism and polytheism in the texts are reflective of this hypothesis.

The stem ʾl is found prominently in the earliest strata of east Semitic, northwest Semitic, and south Semitic groups. Personal names including the stem ʾl are found with similar patterns in both the Amorite and Sabaic languages.

== Historical development ==
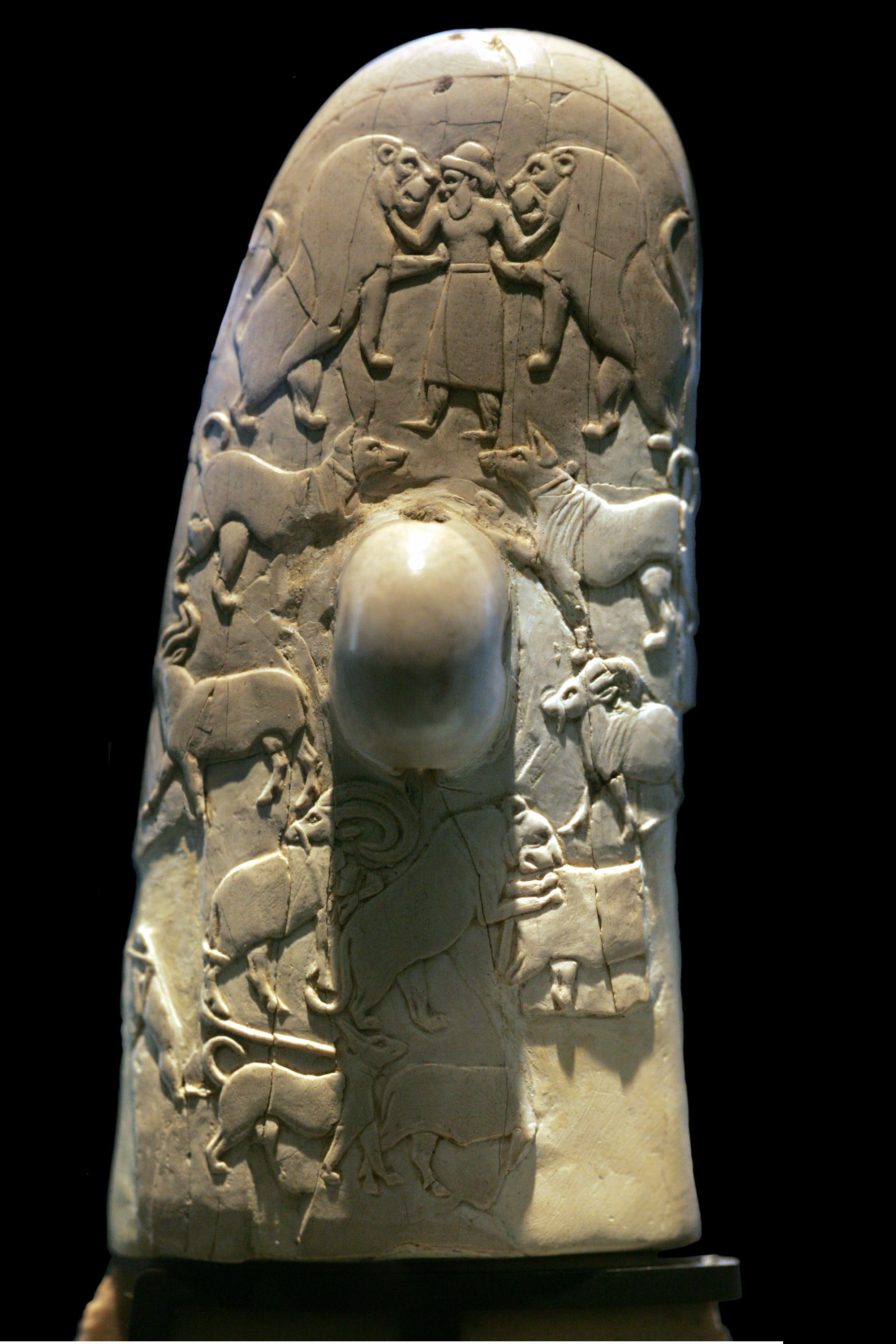
Gebel al-Arak knife Possible depiction of El with two lions, B.C. 3450

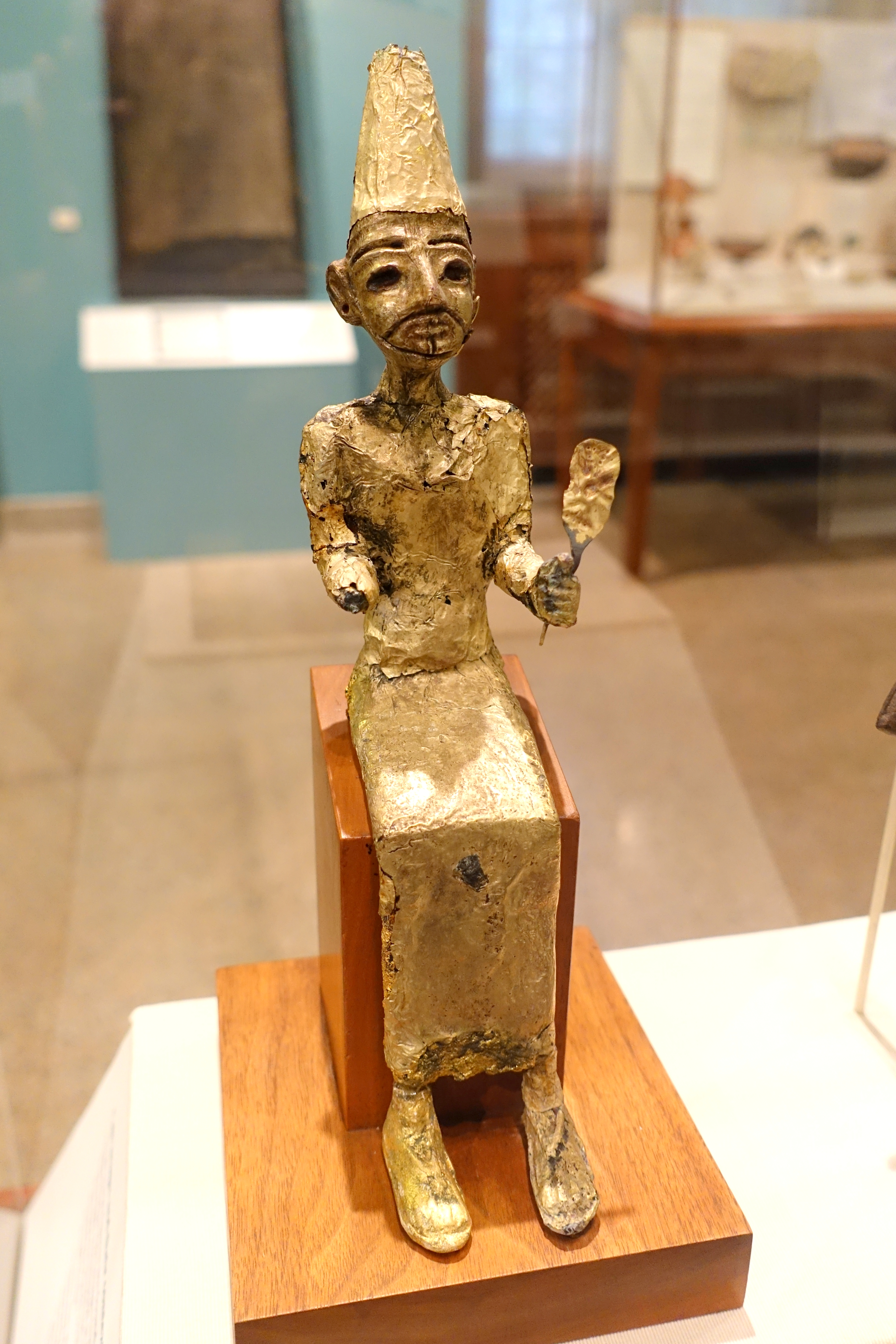
Gilded statue of El (c. 1400–1200 BC) from the site of Tel Megiddo.

There is evidence that the Canaanite/Phoenician and Aramean conception of El is essentially the same as the Amorite conception of El, which was popularized in the 18th century BCE but has origins in the pre-Sargonic period. Any "changes" in El's status can be explained by the randomness of available data. Tribal organizations in West Semitic culture also influenced El's portrayal as a "treaty partner" in covenants, where the clan is seen as the "kin" of the deity.

Eventually, El's cult became central to the ethnogenesis of the Iron Age Israelites, but so far, scholars are unable to determine how much of the population were El worshippers. It is more likely that different locales held different views of El.

Francesca Stavrakopoulou has argued that Yahweh was originally a storm‑warrior deity operating under the authority of the patriarch-god El, and traces how, through a process she terms "pantheon reduction", Yahweh gradually assumed El’s status and characteristics within Israelite religion, rather than immediately replacing him in a sudden shift to monotheism. Drawing on Near Eastern archaeological and textual parallels, Stavrakopoulou argues that the biblical Yahweh was originally depicted in early texts with a fully anthropomorphic, sexualised, and sometimes bull-horned body—including feet, limbs, torso, face, and genitals—before later Greek–Platonic influence recast the deity as immaterial and disembodied. She further highlights inscriptions referencing "Yahweh and his Asherah", indicating a former divine consort akin to El's spouse—an element later removed during proto‑monotheistic reforms.

== Proto-Sinaitic, Phoenician, Aramaic, and Hittite texts ==
The Egyptian god Ptah is given the title ḏū gitti 'Lord of Gath' in a prism from Tel Lachish which has on its opposite face the name of Amenhotep II (c. 1435 – c. 1420 BCE). The title ḏū gitti is also found in Serābitṭ text 353. Frank Moore Cross points out that Ptah is often called the Lord (or one) of eternity and thinks it may be this identification of El with Ptah that led to the epithet ʿolam 'eternal' being applied to El so early and so consistently. Yet another connection is seen with the Mandaean divinity Ptahil, whose name combines Ptah and ʾIl. Wyatt, however, notes that in Ugaritic texts, Ptah is seemingly identified with the craftsman god Kothar-wa-Khasis, not El.

In an inscription in the Proto-Sinaitic script, William F. Albright transcribed the phrase ʾL Ḏ ʿLM, which he translated as the appellation "El, (god) of eternity".

The name Raphael 'God has healed', is attested to in approximately 1350 BCE in Ugarit in one of the Amarna letters, EA333, found in Tell el-Hesi from the ruler of Lachish in the Shephelah to 'The Great One'

A Phoenician-inscribed Arslan Tash amulet of the 7th century BCE may refer to El. The text was translated by Rosenthal as follows:

An eternal bond has been established for us.
Aššur has established (it) for us,
and all the divine beings
and the majority of the group of all the holy ones,
through the bond of heaven and earth for ever, ...

However, Cross translated the text as follows:

The Eternal One (ʿOlam) has made a covenant oath with us,
Asherah has made (a pact) with us.
And all the sons of El,
And the great council of all the Holy Ones.
With oaths of Heaven and Ancient Earth.

In some inscriptions, the name ʾĒl qōne ʾarṣ 'El, Creator of Earth' (Punic: 𐤀𐤋 𐤒𐤍 𐤀𐤓𐤑 ʾl qn ʾrṣ) appears, even including a late inscription at Leptis Magna in Tripolitania dating to the 2nd century. In Hittite texts, the expression becomes the single name Ilkunirsa, this Ilkunirsa appearing as the husband of Asherdu (Asherah) and father of 77 or 88 sons.

In a Hurrian hymn to El (published as KTU 1.128 or Ugaritica V RS 24.278), he is called ʾil brt and ʾil dn, which Cross takes as 'El of the Covenant' and 'El the Judge', respectively.

== Ugarit and the Levant ==
In Canaan and the ancient Levant as a whole, ʼĒl or ʼIl was the supreme god, the father of humankind and all creatures. He also fathered many gods, most importantly Baal, Yam, and Mot, each sharing similar attributes to the Greco-Roman gods Zeus, Poseidon, and Hades, respectively.

As recorded on the clay tablets of Ugarit, ʾEl is the husband of the goddess Athirat (Asherah). Three pantheon lists found at Ugarit in Syria begin with the four gods ilib (which, according to Cross, is the name of a generic kind of deity, perhaps the divine ancestor of the people), ʾEl, Dagon, and Ba'l Ṣapān, who is Haddu. Although Ugarit had a large temple dedicated to Dagon and another to Hadad, there was no temple dedicated to El.

ʾEl had a variety of epithets and forms. He is repeatedly referred to as ṯr il 'Bull El' or 'bull god' and il milk 'ʾEl the King'. He is bny bnwt 'Creator of creatures', ʾabū banī 'ili 'father of the gods', and ʾab ʾadm 'father of man'. The appellations of "eternal", "creator" and "eternal" or "ancient creator" are "characteristic designations of ʾEl in Canaanite myths and liturgies". He is ḥātikuka 'your patriarch'. El is the grey-bearded ancient one, full of wisdom, malku ('King'), ʾab šnm ('Father of years'), ʾEl gibbōr ('El the warrior'). He is also called lṭpn ʾil d pʾid ('the Gracious One, the Benevolent God') and lṭpn wqdš ('the Gracious and Holy One').

ʾEl and his major son, Hadad are symbolized both by the bull, and both wear bull horns on their headdresses.

The Ugaritic text Shahar and Shalim tells how, perhaps near the beginning of all things, ʾEl came to the shores of the sea and saw two women who bobbed up and down. ʾEl was sexually aroused and took the two with him, killed a bird by throwing a staff at it, and roasted it over a fire. He asked the women to tell him when the bird was fully cooked, and to then address him either as husband or as father, for he would thenceforward behave to them as they called him. They saluted him as a husband. He then lay with them, and they gave birth to Shahar 'Dawn' and Shalim 'Dusk'. Again, El lay with his wives, and the wives gave birth to "the gracious gods", "cleavers of the sea", "children of the sea". The names of these wives are not explicitly provided, but some confusing rubrics at the beginning of the account mention the goddess Athirat, who is otherwise El's chief wife, and the goddess Raḥmayyu 'the one of the womb'.

In the Ugaritic Baal Cycle, El is introduced having an assembly of gods on Mount Lel (Lel possibly meaning "Night"), and dwelling on (or in) the fountains of the two rivers at the spring of the two deeps. He dwells in a tent according to some interpretations of the text, which may explain why he had no temple in Ugarit. As to the rivers and the spring of the two deeps, these might refer to real streams, to the mythological sources of the salt-water ocean and the fresh-water sources under the earth, or to the waters above the heavens and the waters beneath the earth. A few miles from the swamp from which the Litani River (the classical Leontes) and the Orontes River flow, Baalbek may be the same as the manbaa al-nahrayn ('Source of the Two Rivers'), the abode of ʾEl in the Baal Cycle discovered in the 1920s and a separate serpent incantation.

In the episode of the "Palace of Ba'al", Hadad invites the "seventy sons of Athirat" to a feast in his new palace. Presumably, these sons have been fathered on Athirat by El; in following passages, they seem to be the gods (ilm) in general, or at least a large portion of them. The only sons of El named individually in the Ugaritic texts are Yamm 'Sea', Mot 'Death', and Ashtar, who may be the chief and leader of most of the sons of ʾEl. Hadad is a few times called ʾEl's son rather than the son of Dagan, possibly because ʾEl is in the position of a clan-father to all the gods.

The fragmentary text R.S. 24.258 describes a marzēaḥ to which ʾEl invites the other gods and then disgraces himself by becoming outrageously drunk and passing out after confronting an otherwise unknown Hubbay, "he with the horns and tail". The text ends with an incantation for the cure for a hangover.

ʾEl's characterization in Ugarit texts is not always favorable. His authority is unquestioned, but sometimes exacted through threat or roundly mocked. He is "both comical and pathetic" in a "role of impotence". But this is arguably a misinterpretation since ʾEl had complementary relationships with other deities. Any "differences" they had pertained to function. For example, ʾEl and Hadad were divine kings, but ʾEl was the executive while Hadad was the sustainer of the cosmos.

== Torah ==
One scholarly position is that the identification of Yahweh with El is a later interpretation and that earlier, Yahweh was thought of as one of many gods, separate from El. Theological interpretations of the Torah consider El as an alternative name for Yahweh. In contrast to this is the Elohist and Priestly source sources, in which El is regarded as an earlier deity than Yahweh. Mark Smith has argued that Yahweh and El were originally separate, but were considered synonymous from very early on. The name Yahweh is used in Genesis 2:4, while Genesis 4:26 states that at that time, Israelites began to "call upon the name of the LORD". The divine name El Shaddai (Biblical Hebrew: אֵל שַׁדַּי, romanized: ʾĒl Šadday), a potential reference to God as the "god of the steppe", may also derive from the cultural beliefs of Upper Mesopotamian immigrants (i.e., Amorites)—who may have been ancestors of the Israelites.

In Genesis 46, Isaac's god introduces himself to Jacob (Israel) in a vision as El:

“I am El, the Elohim of your father,” he said. “Don’t be afraid to go to Egypt, because I will make you a great nation there."

— Genesis 46:3

In Exodus 6, Yahweh reveals to Moses that he had appeared to Abraham, Isaac, and Jacob as "El Shadday" before then revealing his real name:

Elohim spoke to Moses, “I am Yahweh. I appeared to Abraham, Isaac, and Jacob as El Shadday, but I didn’t make myself known to them by my name, Yahweh.

— Exodus 6:2-3

In Deuteronomy 32, as preserved in the Septuagint and the Dead Sea Scrolls, According to Mark. S. Smith, Yahweh is described as a son of El:

When the Most High gave nations their homes
And set the divisions of humankind,
When the Most High gave to the nations their inheritance,
when He separated the children of men,
He set the borders of the peoples according to the number of the children of Israel.

For the portion of the LORD is His people,
Jacob the lot of His inheritance.

However, in Deuteronomy chapter 7 contradicts this view; stating explicitly that God chose them (the Israelites) to be his people. Biblical researchers reveal that these verses in Deuteronomy 32 present an etiological explanation of the origin and division of nations. The high mountain god and head of the pantheon, Elyon (עֶלְיוֹן, 'Most High'), divides the nations according to the number of his children, each getting a group of peoples to preside over. Yahweh, one of Elyon's sons, is given solely Israel as his inheritance.

In Genesis 14:18–20, Abraham accepted the blessing of El when Melchizedek, the king of Salem and high priest of its deity, El Elyon (אֶל עֶלְיוֹן, 'El [the] Most High'), blessed him.

According to The Oxford Companion to World Mythology,

It seems almost certain that the God of the Jews evolved gradually from the Canaanite El, who was in all likelihood the "God of Abraham" ... If El was the high God of Abraham—Elohim, the prototype of Yahveh—Asherah was his wife, and there are archaeological indications that she was perceived as such before she was in effect "divorced" in the context of emerging Judaism of the 7th century BCE.

In some instances, such as in Psalm 29, Yahweh is envisioned as a storm god, something not true for El. It is Yahweh who is prophesied to one day battle Leviathan the serpent, and slay the dragon in the sea in as described in Isaiah 27:1. The slaying of the serpent in myth is a deed attributed to both Ba'al Hadad and Anat in the Ugaritic texts, but not to El.

Such mythological motifs are variously seen as late survivals from a period when Yahweh held a place in theology comparable to that of Hadad at Ugarit; or as late henotheistic and monotheistic applications to Yahweh of deeds more commonly attributed to Hadad; or simply as examples of eclectic application of the same motifs and imagery to various different gods. Similarly, it is unclear whether El Shaddai, El Olam (אֵל עוֹלָם, Ēl 'Ôlām, 'El Everlasting'), El Elyon, etc., were originally understood as separate divinities. Albrecht Alt presented his theories on the original differences of such gods in Der Gott der Väter in 1929.

Others such as Frank Moore Cross, have argued that from the Patriarchal age, these different names were generally understood to refer to the same single great god, El. What is certain is that the form El does appear in Israelite names from every period, including the name Yisrā'ēl (יִשְׂרָאֵל, '[One who] struggles [with] El'). At times, the Tanakh conflates El with Yahweh unambiguously (e.g., Numbers 23:8), but some scholars believe this is an attempt to portray El as a warrior god, as Israelite society grew and evolved into a nation-state.

=== Jewish interpretation ===
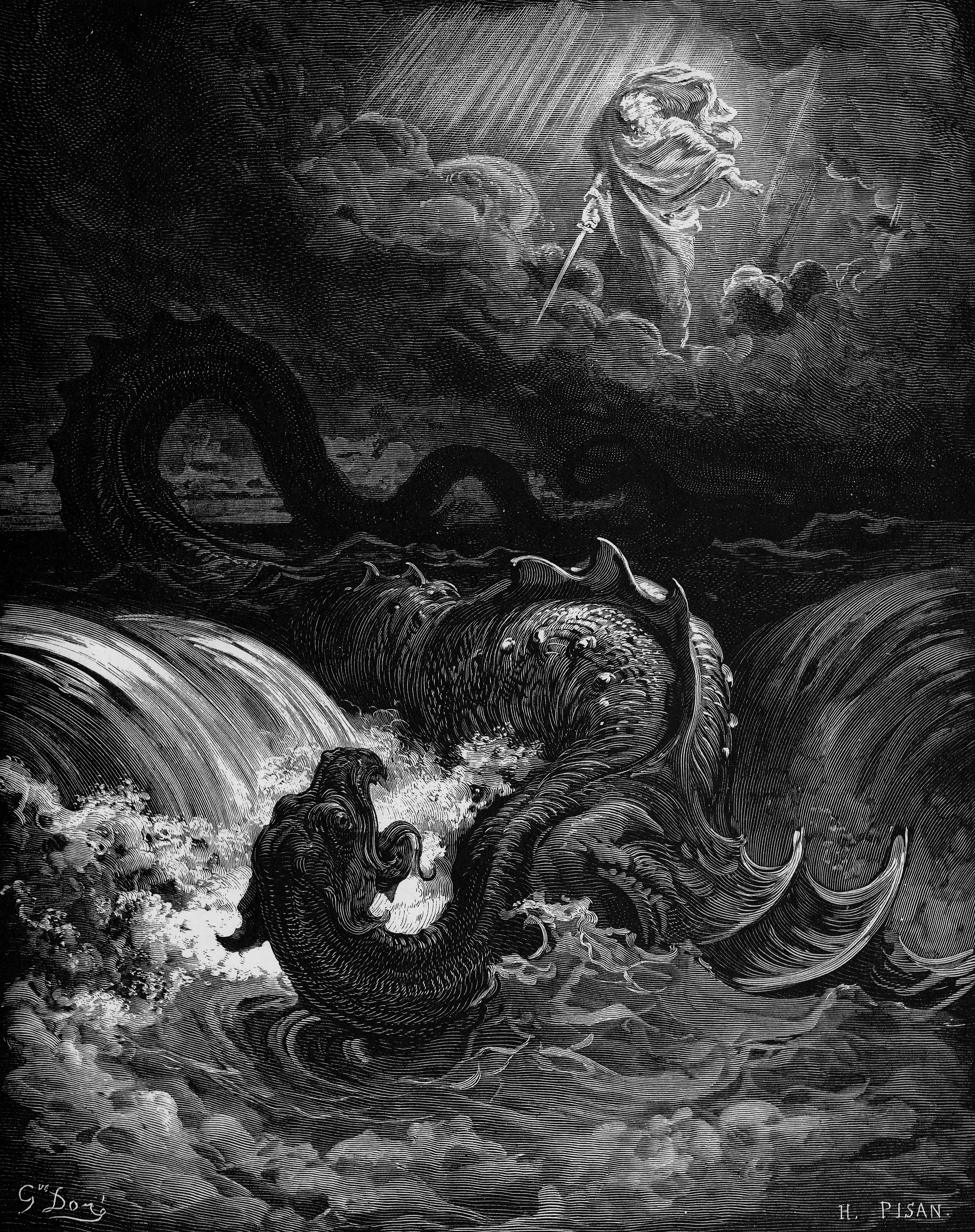
The Destruction of Leviathan by Gustave Doré (1865)

The Hebrew אֵל, in transliteration, is El; the Tiberian Hebrew transliteration is ʾĒl. ʾEl is a generic word for god that could be used for any god, including Hadad, Moloch, or Yahweh.

In the Hebrew Bible, Elohim is a word for a god or the great God (or gods, given that the im suffix makes the word plural). The form ʾEl also appears, mostly in poetic passages and in the patriarchal narratives attributed to the Priestly source of the documentary hypothesis. It occurs 217 times in the Masoretic Text: 73 times in the Psalms and 55 times in the Book of Job, and otherwise mostly in poetic passages or passages written in elevated prose. It occasionally appears with the definite article as hā'Ēl (הָאֵל, 'the El'), such as in Deuteronomy 10:17, 2 Samuel 22:31, and 2 Samuel 22:48.

The theological position of the Hebrew Bible is that the names El and Elohim, when used in the singular to mean the supreme god, refer to Yahweh, while the plural is interpreted to refer to other unspecified heavenly beings, such as angels.

== Sanchuniathon ==
Philo of Byblos (c. 64–141 AD) was a Greek writer whose account Sanchuniathon survives in quotation by Eusebius and may contain the major surviving traces of Phoenician mythology. El (rendered Elus or called by his standard Greek counterpart Cronus) is not the creator god or first god. El is rather the son of Sky (Uranus) and Earth (Ge). Sky and Earth are themselves children of 'Elyôn 'Most High'. El is brother to the God Bethel, to Dagon and to an unknown god, equated with the Greek Atlas and to the goddesses Aphrodite/'Ashtart, Rhea (presumably Asherah), and Dione (equated with Ba'alat Gebal). El is the father of Persephone and of Athena (presumably the goddess 'Anat).

Sky and Earth have separated from one another in hostility, but Sky insists on continuing to force himself on Earth and attempts to destroy the children born of such unions. At last, with the advice of his daughter Athena and the god Hermes Trismegistus (perhaps Thoth), El successfully attacks his father Sky with a sickle and spear of iron. He and his military allies the Eloim gain Sky's kingdom.

In a later passage it is explained that El castrated Sky. One of Sky's concubines (who was given to El's brother, Dagon) was already pregnant by Sky. The son who is born of the union, called Demarûs or Zeus, but once called Adodus, is obviously Hadad, the Ba'al of the Ugaritic texts who now becomes an ally of his grandfather Sky and begins to make war on El.

El has three wives, his sisters or half-sisters Aphrodite/Astarte ('Ashtart), Rhea (presumably Asherah), and Dione (identified by Sanchuniathon with Ba'alat Gebal the tutelary goddess of Byblos, a city which Sanchuniathon says that El founded).

El is depicted primarily as a warrior; in Ugaritic sources Baal has the warrior role and El is peaceful, and it may be that the Sanchuniathon depicts an earlier tradition that was more preserved in the southern regions of Canaan.

Eusebius, through whom the Sanchuniathon is preserved, is not interested in setting the work forth completely or in order. But we are told that El slew his own son Sadidus (a name that some commentators think might be a corruption of Shaddai, one of the epithets of the Biblical El) and that El also beheaded one of his daughters. Later, perhaps referring to this same death of Sadidus we are told:

But on the occurrence of a pestilence and mortality Cronus offers his only begotten son as a whole burnt-offering to his father Sky and circumcises himself, compelling his allies also to do the same.

A fuller account of the sacrifice appears later:

It was a custom of the ancients in great crises of danger for the rulers of a city or nation, in order to avert the common ruin, to give up the most beloved of their children for sacrifice as a ransom to the avenging daemons; and those who were thus given up were sacrificed with mystic rites. Cronus then, whom the Phoenicians call Elus, who was king of the country and subsequently, after his decease, was deified as the star Saturn, had by a nymph of the country named Anobret an only begotten son, whom they on this account called Iedud, the only begotten being still so called among the Phoenicians; and when very great dangers from war had beset the country, he arrayed his son in royal apparel, and prepared an altar, and sacrificed him.

The account also relates that Thoth:

also devised for Cronus as insignia of royalty four eyes in front and behind ... but two of them quietly closed, and upon his shoulders four wings, two as spread for flying, and two as folded. And the symbol meant that Cronus could see when asleep, and sleep while waking: and similarly in the case of the wings, that he flew while at rest, and was at rest when flying. But to each of the other gods he gave two wings upon the shoulders, as meaning that they accompanied Cronus in his flight. And to Cronus himself again he gave two wings upon his head, one representing the all-ruling mind, and one sensation.

This is the form under which El/Cronus appears on coins from Byblos from the reign of Antiochus IV Epiphanes (175–164 BCE) four spread wings and two folded wings, leaning on a staff. Such images continued to appear on coins until after the time of Augustus.

== Poseidon ==
A bilingual inscription from Palmyra dated to the 1st century equates El-Creator-of-the-Earth with the Greek god Poseidon. Going back to the 8th century BCE, the bilingual inscription at Karatepe in the Taurus Mountains equates El-Creator-of-the-Earth to Luwian hieroglyphs read as ^{d}a-a-ś, this being the Luwian form of the name of the Babylonian water god Ea, lord of the abyss of water under the earth. (This inscription lists El in second place in the local pantheon, following Ba'al Shamîm and preceding the Eternal Sun.)

Poseidon is known to have been worshipped in Beirut, his image appearing on coins from that city. Poseidon of Beirut was also worshipped at Delos where there was an association of merchants, shipmasters, and warehousemen called the Poseidoniastae of Berytus founded in 110 or 109 BCE. Three of the four chapels at its headquarters on the hill northwest of the Sacred Lake were dedicated to Poseidon, the Tyche of the city equated with Astarte (that is 'Ashtart), and to Eshmun.

Also at Delos, that association of Tyrians, though mostly devoted to Heracles-Melqart, elected a member to bear a crown every year when sacrifices to Poseidon took place. A banker named Philostratus donated two altars, one to Palaistine Aphrodite Urania ('Ashtart) and one to Poseidon "of Ascalon".

Though Sanchuniathon distinguishes Poseidon from his Elus/Cronus, this might be a splitting off of a particular aspect of El in a euhemeristic account. Identification of an aspect of El with Poseidon rather than with Cronus might have been felt to better fit with Hellenistic religious practice, if indeed this Phoenician Poseidon really is the El who dwells at the source of the two deeps in Ugaritic texts. More information is needed to be certain.

== See also ==
- Ahura Mazda – Highest deity of Zoroastrianism
- Allah – Arabic word for God
- Ancient Semitic religion
- Anu – Ancient Mesopotamian god of the sky; god of all gods
- Divine Council – Assembly of deities over which a higher-level God presides
- Elagabalus (deity) – Near Eastern sun god
- Enki – God in Sumerian mythology
- King of the gods
- Names of God in Judaism
- Theophory in the Bible
