= Ancient Semitic religion =

Ancient Semitic religion encompasses the polytheistic religions of the Semitic peoples from the ancient Near East and Northeast Africa. Since the term Semitic represents a rough category when referring to cultures, as opposed to languages, the definitive bounds of the term "ancient Semitic religion" are only approximate but exclude the religions of "non-Semitic" speakers of the region such as Egyptians, Elamites, Hittites, Hurrians, Mitanni, Urartians, Luwians, Minoans, Greeks, Phrygians, Lydians, Persians, Medes, Philistines and Parthians.

Semitic traditions and their pantheons fall into regional categories: Canaanite religions of the Levant (including the henotheistic ancient Hebrew religion of the Israelites, Judeans and Samaritans, as well as the religions of the Amorites, Phoenicians, Moabites, Edomites, Ammonites and Suteans); the Sumerian-influenced Mesopotamian religion; the Phoenician Canaanite religion of Carthage; Nabataean religion; Eblaite, Ugarite, Dilmunite and Aramean religions; and Arabian polytheism.

Semitic polytheism transitioned into Abrahamic monotheism by way of Yahwism, a variety of Canaanite paganism centred on Yahweh, the national god of the Iron Age kingdoms of Israel and Judah. In this process, Yahweh was syncretized with El, the supreme god of the Canaanite pantheon, whose name "El" אל, or elah אלה is a word for "god" in Hebrew, cognate to Arabic ʼilāh إله, and its definitive pronoun form الله Allāh, "(The) God".

== Proto-Semitic pantheon ==
Abbreviations: Akk. Akkadian-Babylonian; Ug. Ugaritic; Ph. Phoenician; Heb. Hebrew; Ar. Arabic; OSA Old South Arabian; Eth. Ethiopic

- ʾIlu: lit. 'god, deity' (sky god, head of the pantheon: Akk. Ilu, Ug. il, Ph. ʾl/Ēlos, Heb. El/Elohim, Ar. Allāh, OSA ʾl).
- ʿAṯiratu: (ʾIlu's wife: Ug. aṯrt, Heb. Ašērāh, OSA ʿṯrt). The meaning of the name is unknown. She is also called ʾIlatu lit. 'goddess' (Akk. Ilat, Ph. ʾlt, Ar. Allāt).
- ʿAṯtaru: (god of fertility: Ug. ʿṯtr, OSA ʿṯtr, Eth. ʿAstar sky god).
- ʿAṯtartu: (goddess of fertility: Akk. Ištar, Ug. ʿṯtrt, Ph. ʿštrt / Astarte, Heb. ʿAštoreṯ).
- Haddu/Hadadu: (storm god: Akk. Adad, Ug. hd, Ph. Adodos). The meaning of the name is probably 'thunderer'. This god is also known as Baʿlu lit. 'husband, lord' (Akk. Bel, Ug. bʿl, Ph. bʿl/Belos, Heb. Baʿal).
- Śamšu: lit. 'sun' (sun goddess: Ug. špš, OSA: šmš, but Akk. Šamaš is a male god).
- Wariḫu: lit. 'moon' (moon god: Ug. yrḫ, Heb. Yārēaḥ, OSA wrḫ).

== Akkad, Assyria and Babylonia ==
The Sun, Moon, and the five planets visible to the naked eye connected with the chief gods of the Babylonian pantheon. A list now held in the British Museum arranges the sevenfold planetary group in the following order:

- Sin (the Moon)
- Shamash (the Sun)
- Marduk (Jupiter)
- Ishtar (Venus)
- Ninurta (Saturn)
- Nabu (Mercury)
- Nergal (Mars)

The religion of the Assyrian Empire (sometimes called Ashurism) centered on Ashur, patron deity of the city of Assur, and Ishtar, patroness of Nineveh. The last positively recorded worship of Ashur and other Assyrian-Mesopotamian gods dates back to the 3rd century AD in the face of the adaptation of Christianity from the 1st century AD onwards, although there is evidence of isolated pockets of worship among Assyrian people as late as the 17th century.

Ashur, the patron deity of the eponymous capital of Assur from the Early Bronze Age (c. 22nd century BC), was in constant rivalry with the later emerging Marduk (from c. 19th century BC), the patron deity of Babylon. In Assyria, Ashur eventually superseded Marduk, even becoming the husband of Ishtar.

The major Assyro-Babylonian-Akkadian gods were:

- Ashur/Anshar (Classical Syriac: ܐܵܫܘܼܪ), patron of Assur
- Ishtar, (Astarte) (Classical Syriac: ܐܸܣܬܪܵܐ), goddess of love and war and patroness of Nineveh
- Nabu (Classical Syriac: ܢܒ݂ܘܿ): god of writing and scribes
- Nergal (Classical Syriac: ܢܸܪܓܲܠ): god of the Underworld
- Ninurta, Assyrian god of war and hunting
- Tiamat: sea goddess
- Samnuha
- Kubaba
- Marduk (Classical Syriac: ܒܹܝܠ)
- Enlil
- Ninlil
- Nisroch
- Hanbi: father of Pazuzu
- Anu, supreme divinity of the Heavens
- Ea, Sumerian Enki: god of crafts
- Kishar
- Sin / Suen, Sumerian Nanna (Classical Syriac: ܣܝܼܢ): moon god
- Išḫara
- Shamash (Classical Syriac: ܫܡܫ): sun god
- Adad/Hadad
- Dagan/Dagon
- Bel (Classical Syriac: ܒܹܝܠ)
- Tammuz (Classical Syriac: ܬܲܡܘܼܙ)

Major Assyro-Babylonian demons and heroes were:

- Adapa (Oannes)
- Gilgamesh (Classical Syriac: ܓܡܝܼܓܘܿܣ)
- Lugalbanda
- Lilitu (Classical Syriac: ܠܸܠܝܼܬ݂ܵܐ)
- Pazuzu
- Ninurta

== Canaan ==
The Canaanite religion was practiced by people living in the ancient Levant throughout the Bronze Age and Iron Age. Until the excavation (1928 onwards) of the city of Ras Shamra (known as Ugarit in antiquity) in northern Syria and the discovery of its Bronze Age archive of clay tablet alphabetic cuneiform texts, scholars knew little about Canaanite religious practice. Papyrus seems to have been the preferred writing material for scribes at the time. Unlike the papyrus documents found in Egypt, ancient papyri in the Levant have often simply decayed from exposure to the humid Mediterranean climate. As a result, the accounts in the Bible became the primary sources of information on ancient Canaanite religion. Supplementing the Biblical accounts, several secondary and tertiary Greek sources have survived, including Lucian of Samosata's treatise De Dea Syria (The Syrian Goddess, 2nd century CE), fragments of the Phoenician History of Sanchuniathon as preserved by Philo of Byblos (c. 64 – 141 CE), and the writings of Damascius (c. 458 – after 538). Recent study of the Ugaritic material has uncovered additional information about the religion, supplemented by inscriptions from the Levant and Tel Mardikh archive (excavated in the early 1960s).

Like other peoples of the ancient Near East, the Canaanites were polytheistic, with families typically focusing worship on ancestral household gods and goddesses while acknowledging the existence of other deities such as Baal, Anath, and El. Kings also played an important religious role and in certain ceremonies, such as the sacred marriage of the New Year Festival; Canaanites may have revered their kings as gods.

According to the pantheon, known in Ugarit as 'ilhm (Elohim) or the children of El (compare the Biblical "sons of God"), the creator deity called El, fathered the other deities. In the Greek sources he was married to Beruth (Beirut, the city). The pantheon was supposedly obtained by Philo of Byblos from Sanchuniathon of Berythus (Beirut). The marriage of the deity with the city seems to have biblical parallels with the stories that link Melkart with Tyre, Yahweh with Jerusalem, and Tanit and Baal Hammon with Carthage. El Elyon is mentioned (as God Most High) in Genesis 14.18–19 as the God whose priest was Melchizedek, king of Salem.

Philo states that the union of El Elyon and his consort resulted in the birth of Uranus and Ge (Greek names for Heaven and Earth). This closely parallels the opening verse of the Hebrew Bible, Genesis 1:1—"In the beginning God (Elohim) created the Heavens (Shemayim) and the Earth" (Eretz). It also parallels the story of the Babylonian Anunaki gods.

== Abrahamic religions ==
Many scholars believe that the Assyro-Babylonian Enuma Elish influenced the Genesis creation narrative. The Epic of Gilgamesh influenced the Genesis flood narrative. The Sumerian myth of Enmerkar and the Lord of Aratta also had influence on the Tower of Babel myth in Genesis. Some writers trace the story of Esther to Assyrio-Babylonian roots. El Elyon appears in Balaam's story in Numbers and in Moses' song in Deuteronomy 32.8. The Masoretic Texts suggest:

When the Most High ('Elyōn) divided to the nations their inheritance, he separated the sons of man (Ādām); he set the bounds of the people according to the number of the sons of Israel.

Rather than "sons of Israel", the Septuagint, the Greek Old Testament, suggests the "angelōn theou," or "angels of God", and a few versions even have huiōn theou (sons of God). The Dead Sea Scrolls version of this suggests that there were in fact 70 sons of the Most High God sent to rule over the 70 nations of the Earth. This idea of the 70 nations of Earth, each ruled over by one of the Elohim (sons of God), is also found in Ugaritic texts. The Arslan Tash inscription suggests that each of the 70 sons of El Elyon was bound to their people by a covenant. Thus, Crossan translates:

The Eternal One ('Olam) has made a covenant oath with us,
Asherah has made (a pact) with us.
And all the sons of El,
And the great council of all the Holy Ones (Qedesh).
With oaths of Heaven and Ancient Earth.

== See also ==
- Ancient Egyptian religion
- Arabian mythology
- Ancient Semitic-speaking peoples
- History of Judaism
- Mandaeism
- Moses and Monotheism
- Names of God in Judaism
- Origins of Judaism
- Prehistoric religion
- Religions of the ancient Near East
- Semitic Neopaganism
