= Agasaya =

Semitic war goddess

Agasaya is a Semitic war goddess. Her name is thought to translate to "the shrieker", though there is no solid proof of this. Agasaya later got merged into Ishtar, a Babylonian goddess, along with many other goddesses; this is likely due to conquering. Agasaya became the warrior aspect of Ishtar and lived on in history this way. There is also some speculation that Ishtar, and therefore Agasaya, influenced/merged into the Egyptian Goddess Anut. Not much is known about Agasaya but her weapons may have been a bow and arrows and a scimitar.
