= Phoenician–Punic literature =

The Atlantic voyage of Hanno the Navigator in the 5th century BC

Phoenician–Punic literature is literature written in Phoenician, the language of the ancient civilization of Phoenicia, or in the Punic language that developed from Phoenician and was used in Ancient Carthage. Its nature and extent are extremely uncertain because there is very little direct evidence. Phoenician and Punic text survives only in inscriptions, of which very few can be interpreted as literary; on coins; and via Greek and Latin sources, such as the fragments of Sanchuniathon's History and Mago's agricultural treatise, the Greek translation of the voyage of Hanno the Navigator, and a few lines in the Poenulus by Plautus.

This limited evidence has led some scholars to argue that there was not a substantial literary tradition in Phoenician or Punic. However, Greek and Roman writings suggest that both Phoenicia and Carthage had extensive libraries and produced literature, including the Phoenician sources used by Greek and Latin writers like Philo of Byblos and Menander of Ephesus.

== History and sources ==
Main Phoenician trade routes, which linked the metropolis with its colonies.

The Jewish historian Flavius Josephus alludes to the Phoenician or Tyrian chronicles that he allegedly consulted to write his historical works. Herodotus also mentioned the existence of books from Byblos and a History of Tyre preserved in the temple of Hercules-Melqart in Tyre. In addition, it is possible to find some remnants of the influence exerted by certain writings of Ugarit in some biblical books, such as the Genesis or the Book of Ruth, that had traces of poetic compositions of religious or political themes – with a markedly propagandistic or philosophical undertone.

Rufius Festus Avienius also alludes to old Punic records from which he would have drawn his reports on the voyage of Himilco. Greco-Roman sources mention a number of Punic books saved from the looting and burning of Carthage by the legions of Scipio Aemilianus in the spring of 146 BC. In his work Natural History, Pliny indicates that after the fall of Carthage, many of these books were handed over to the Numidian rulers and the Roman Senate ordered the translation into Latin of one text, Mago's agricultural treatise, establishing a commission under the leadership of Decimus Junius Piso.

According to the Byzantine Encyclopedia called Suda, there was a historian of antiquity known as Charon of Carthage that wrote a collection of books: Lives of Illustrious Men, Lives of Illustrious Women, and Tyrants.

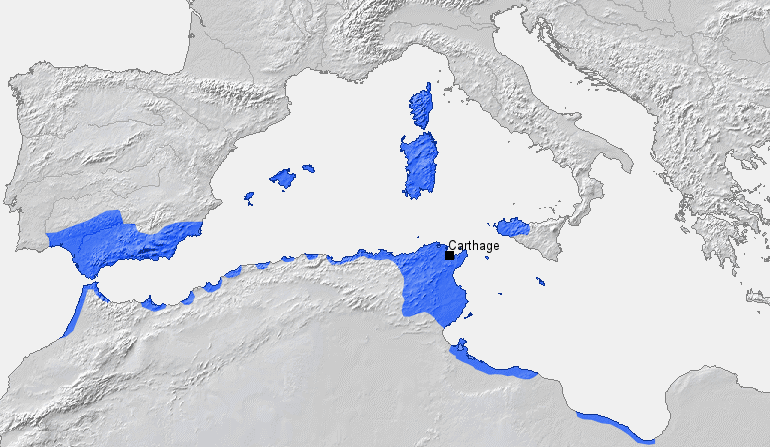
Extent of Carthaginian territory before the First Punic War.

Augustine of Hippo (who lived between the 3rd and 4th centuries AD) considered Punic as one of the main "sapiential" languages, along with Hebrew, Canaanite, Latin and Greek. On Punic literature, he wrote:

Quae lingua si improbatur abs te, nega Punicis Libris, ut a viris doctissimus proditur, multa sapienter esse mandata memoriae (English: If you reject this language, you are denying what many scholars have acknowledged: many things have been wisely preserved from oblivion thanks to books written in Punic.)

To Augustine, this literature was not only ancient but also contemporary. He mentioned abecedaria and psalms composed in Punic and that both Donatists and Neo-Punic Catholics wrote "little books in Punic" with "testimonies of the sacred scriptures". An important part of the Bible is thought to have been translated into Neo-Punic.

== Subjects ==
=== Agricultural treatises ===
This is one of the areas where the most information is available, since it is known that after the end of the Third Punic War, the Roman Senate decided to translate an encyclopedic treatise on agronomy written by Mago – considered by Columella as the father of agronomy – into Latin. This treatise comprised 28 books, of which 66 fragments have been preserved. It includes topics such as viticulture, topography, veterinary medicine, beekeeping, and fruit arboriculture, as well as recommendations defending the idea that the properties should not be too large and that the owner should not be absent.

Mago may not have been the only Carthaginian treatisist concerned with these topics, since Columella clearly indicates that there were several other writers focusing on the subject; however, he does not specify who they might have been or the depth of their work – with the exception of one Amilcar.

=== Philosophical writings ===
Philosophical works are likely to have been written even if there is little evidence, since it is known that in Carthage as well as in Gadir there were Platonic and Pythagorean schools, currents that seem to have been widely accepted in the colonial Phoenician sphere. We only know of works by Moderatus, of the Gaditan school, who wrote in Greek. A treatise on philosophy is attributed to Sanchuniathon – of which there is no record other than a simple mention.

=== Religious writings ===
The fragments of Sanchuniathon's work that have been preserved form the most extensive religious text on Phoenician mythology known to date. It is a kind of Theogony that includes passages on cosmogony, heroic tales, the life of the gods, and the use of rituals with snakes. There is also an allusion made by Plutarch in regards to a series of sacred scrolls rescued from Carthage and hidden underground, although the veracity of this information has not been confirmed. Conversely, Phoenician religious literature is known to have had a profound influence on the biblical account of Job.

=== Historical treatises ===
In The Histories by Polybius, he clearly refers to Carthaginian historians, and Sallust claimed to have consulted the Punic books of the Numidian king Hiempsal. Sanchuniathon's historical work, considered the most extensive work produced in Phoenician, was translated into Greek in the 2nd century BC, although only a long fragment has been preserved – one that primarily covers religious themes. However, the authenticity of the texts attributed to Sanchuniathon has been questioned several times, without reaching a clear consensus.

There are numerous allusions in Greek literature – until after 3rd century BC – to a Cosmogony written by Mochus of Sidon in the 14th century BC. The likely existence of biographies of Hannibal has also been noted. According to Polybius and Titus Livy, Hannibal had such deeds recorded in Phoenician and Greek in 205 BC, in the temple of Hera in Lacinia, and it is probable that he was simply continuing an ancient tradition by which Carthaginian generals used to write down their heroic deeds and give them to a temple to be preserved. Another example of this type of literature is the Agrigentum inscription, preserving a fragment of a narrative of the takeover of Agrigentum in 406 BC:

𐤅𐤉𐤋𐤊 𐤓𐤁𐤌 𐤀𐤃𐤍𐤁𐤏𐤋 𐤁𐤍 𐤂𐤓𐤎𐤊𐤍 𐤄𐤓𐤁 𐤅𐤇𐤌𐤋𐤊𐤕 𐤁𐤍 𐤇𐤍𐤀 𐤄𐤓𐤁 𐤏𐤋𐤔 𐤅𐤕𐤌𐤊 𐤄𐤌𐤕𐤀𐤉𐤕 𐤀𐤂𐤓𐤂𐤍𐤕 𐤅𐤔𐤕 𐤄(𐤌)𐤕 𐤔𐤋𐤌 𐤃𐤋 𐤁𐤏𐤋 𐤍𐤅𐤎
wylk rbm ʾdnbʿl bn grskn hrb wḥmlkt bn ḥnʾ hrb ʿlš wtmk hmt ʾytʾgrgnt wšt h[m]t šlm dl bʿl nws
General Idnibal, son of Gisco the Great, and Himilco, son of Hanno the Great, set out at dawn, and took Agrigentum; and they [the Agrigentines] surrendered, including those who had fled.

=== Poetry ===
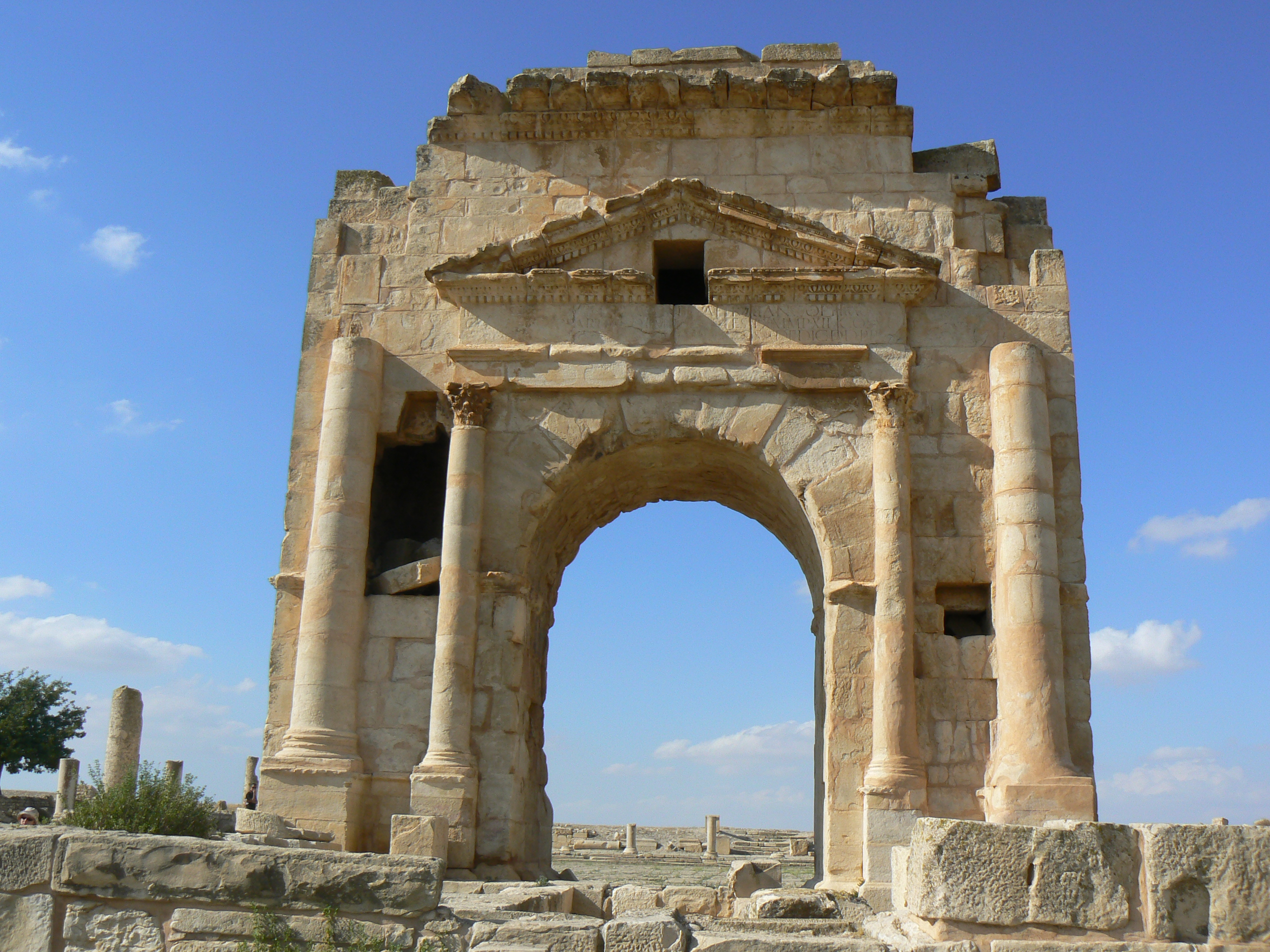
Ruins of the arch built by Trajan in Maktar (Tunisia).

Krahmalkov interprets a few Punic-language inscriptions as poetry representing remnants of a literary tradition that included rhymed rhetorical prose and iambic poetry. However, both Krahmalkov's text and translation have been harshly disputed, with other scholars describing his analysis of the Iulius Nasif inscription as "preposterous" and "misrepresentative".

Badnim garasth is on,
mysyrthim, bal sem ra;
sab siben Mycne,
is ab syth sath syby;
in aab sa[l]e(m) lo sal:
«un ath ab[dach]a!»

From Adnim I brought forth the wicked fellow,
from the Sirthis, to him, of ill fame;
(when) our army surrounded Micne,
then I made that enemy [my] captive;
The enemy asked mercy for himself:
"Spare your slave!"

—Iulius Nasif, ed. Krahmalkov (Adnim, around 350 AD)

Hymn to Ḥṭr-Mescar, KAI 144 I Punic dialect (Maktar, Tunisia)
𐤋𐤀𐤋𐤀𐤌 𐤄𐤒𐤉𐤃𐤔 𐤋𐤔𐤀𐤕 𐤀𐤇𐤕 𐤔𐤌𐤌 𐤁𐤎𐤅𐤁 𐤌𐤋𐤊 𐤇𐤈𐤓 𐤌𐤉𐤎𐤊𐤓 𐤓𐤆𐤍 𐤉𐤌𐤌 𐤁𐤏𐤋 𐤇𐤓𐤃𐤕 𐤏𐤋 𐤂𐤁𐤓𐤕𐤌	lilīm iqqiddīs laset ot semim Biswb mūlek Ḥṭr, Meskar rūzen yammīm Bal aradot al gubūratim
Exalt the name of the holy god! Ḥṭr, king of the land; Mescar, ruler of the seas, the one who inspires fear because of his power.

=== Language and grammar ===
A Latin manuscript, the Berne codex 123, suggests Phoenician had 12 parts of speech: noun, pronoun, verb, adjective, adverb, preposition, conjunction, interjection, article, impersonal mood, infinitive and the gerund. In addition, Eusebius of Caesarea attributes the authorship of a treatise titled On the Phoenician Alphabet to Sanchuniathon.

=== Navigation and geographical treatises ===
Although the Phoenicians were famous as navigators and explorers, only two written accounts are known to have existed, both in the periplous form: that of Hanno the Navigator and that of Himilco. The surviving text of Hanno's periplous is in Greek and purports to be the text of an inscription; its origin and original language are debated. Greek and Latin historiography seemed to be completely unaware of Hanno's voyage before the fall of Carthage, but imperial Roman writers make use of it. Himilco's periplous does not survive but is mentioned by Pliny the Elder and implied in some comments made by Avienius, which he claims come from Punic records.

It has also been hypothesized that King Juba II based his geographical knowledge of the Nile's origins on Punic books that he kept at his court – as recorded by Amianus Marcellinus – indicating that the river's headwaters were on a mountain in Mauritania. A similar thing applies to Juba II's supposed voyages in the Canary archipelago, an expedition recorded by Pliny. Although it is clear from the way Pliny describes the islands that some voyager had reached this region, it is debated whether this expedition was carried out by Juba II or if he merely collected geographical information from the Carthaginian books that he inherited from his ancestors.

Marinus of Tyre, living after the Phoenician language ceased to be used in Roman Phoenicia, was considered as the first geographer of his time worthy of the title of "scientist". Although his work has disappeared, Claudius Ptolemy used it extensively while writing his Geographia.

=== International and legislative treaties ===
No direct information is available, but there is evidence that the international treaties Rome signed with Carthage were kept in the Capitol on bronze tablets, and it is to be presumed that the Punics preserved them as well. The treaty signed in 215 BC by Hannibal and Philip V of Macedon is known to have been drafted in Greek and Punic, and alluded to various Carthaginian divinities reminiscent of the treaty signed centuries before by Esarhaddon and the King of Tyre, a fact widely interpreted as a sign of state conservatism that could be explained only through the preservation of these documents over the centuries.

=== Drama ===
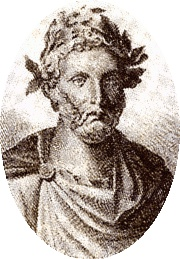
Plautus, Roman playwright.

Poenulus ("The Little Punic"), a Latin comedy play by the playwright Plautus which has several Carthaginian characters, includes a few lines and a speech in Punic. Roman comedies were translations and adaptations of Greek New Comedy, and it is unclear whether the Punic text was similarly in the original Greek play (ὁ Καρχηδόνιος "the Carthaginian", possibly by Alexis of Thurii) or whether it was composed for the Poenulus, perhaps by a bilingual speaker working with Plautus. Alternately, Krahmalkov has suggested that there were full Punic translations of the same plays that formed the basis for Plautus' Poenulus and Aulularia, and that Plautus took the Punic lines from these plays.

== See also ==
- History of Carthage
- Phoenician alphabet
- Punic people
