= Mot (god) =

Canaanite god

- Death and the Underworld
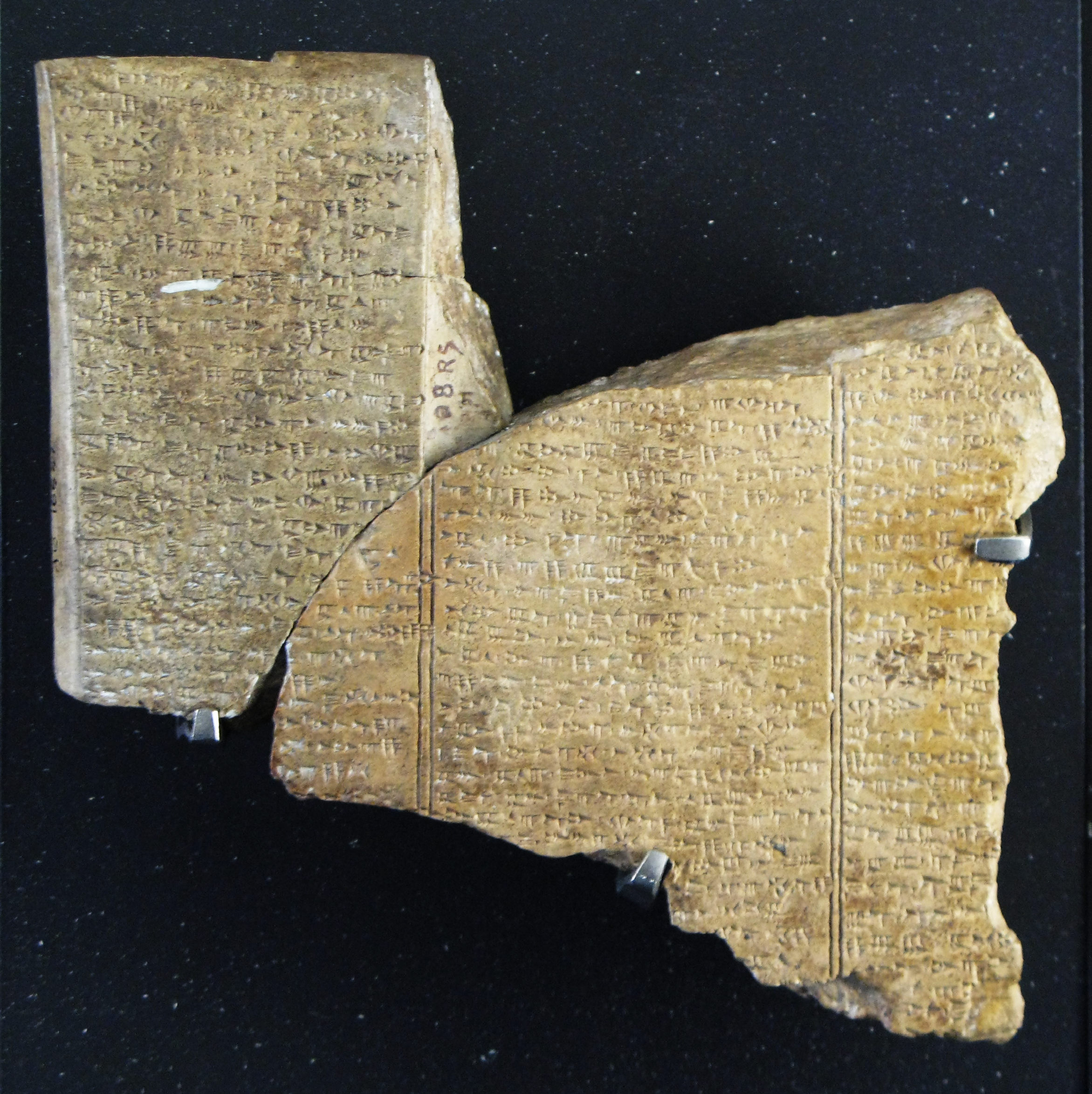
- Fragments of tablets bearing the "Baal Cycle", a notable source on Caananite religion and its Death (Mot)
- Ugaritic: 𐎎𐎚
- Major cult center: Ugarit

Mot, also known as Maweth, (Phoenician: 𐤌𐤕 mūt, Hebrew: מות māweṯ, Ugaritic: 𐎎𐎚) was the Canaanite god of death and the Underworld. He was also known to the people of Ugarit and in Phoenicia, where Canaanite religion was widespread. The main source of information about Mot in Canaanite mythology comes from the texts discovered at Ugarit, but he is also mentioned in the surviving fragments of Philo of Byblos's Greek translation of the writings of the Phoenician Sanchuniathon.

== Forms of the name ==
In Ugaritic myth, Mot (spelled mt) is a personification of death. The word belongs to a set of cognates meaning 'death' in other Semitic and Afro-Asiatic languages: Arabic موت mawt; Hebrew מות (mot or mavet; ancient Hebrew muth or maveth/maweth); Maltese mewt; Syriac ܡܰܘܬܳܐ (mautā); Ge'ez ሞት (mot); Canaanite, Egyptian, Berber, Aramaic, Nabataean, and Palmyrene מות (mwt); Jewish Aramaic, Christian Palestinian Aramaic, and Samaritan מותא (mwt’); Mandaean muta; Akkadian 𒍗 (mūtu); Hausa mutuwa; and Angas mut.

== Religion and mythology ==
=== Ugaritic texts ===
The main source of the story of Mot ("Death") is Ugaritic. He is a son of 'El, and according to instructions given by the god Hadad (Ba'al) to his messengers, lives in a city named hmry ('Mirey'), a pit is his throne, and Filth is the land of his heritage. But Ba'al warns them:

that you not come near to divine Death,
lest he make you like a lamb in his mouth,
(and) you both be carried away like a kid in the breach of his windpipe.

Hadad seems to be urging Mot to come to his feast and submit himself to him.

Death sends back a message that his appetite is that of lions in the wilderness, like the longing of dolphins in the sea, and he threatens to devour Ba'al himself. In a subsequent passage, Death seemingly makes good his threat, or at least is deceived into believing he has slain Ba'al. Numerous gaps in the text make this portion of the tale obscure. The sun stops shining as its goddess Shapash joins Ba'al's sister 'Anat in burying him. 'Anat then comes upon Mot, seizing him, splitting him with a blade, winnowing him in a sieve, burning him in a fire, grinding him under a millstone, and throwing what remains in the end over a field for birds to devour.

El, Baal's father, dreams that Baal is alive and sends Shapash to bring him back to life because the land has become dry.

After seven years, Death returns, seeking vengeance and demanding one of Ba'al's brothers to feed upon. A gap in the text is followed by Mot complaining that Ba'al has given Mot his own brothers to eat and his mother's sons to consume. A single combat between the two breaks out until the sun goddess Shapash upbraids Mot, informing him that his own father, El, will turn against him and overturn his throne if he continues. Mot concedes, and the conflict ends.

==== Influence on the Passover ====
A few scholars have postulated the idea that the Jewish tradition of Passover may have begun as a ritual connected with the myth of Mot killing Baal, as Baal was the god of rain among the Canaanites and certain other Semitic nations. Modern scholars have disputed such views as a failure to take into account the original narrative and cultural context, pointing instead to a purposeful subversion of the Baal/Mot myth on the part of the authors of the Hebrew Bible, working in a framework of an audience who were well-acquainted with the religious worldview of the surrounding nations.

=== Phoenician sources ===
A Phoenician account survives in a paraphrase of the Greek author Philo of Byblos by Eusebius, who writes of a Phoenician historian named Sanchuniathon. In this account, Death is a son of 'El and counted as a god, as the text says in speaking of 'El/Cronus:

And not long after another of his sons by Rhea, named Muth, having died, he deifies him, and the Phoenicians call him Thanatos ['Death'] and Pluto.

But in an earlier philosophical creation myth, Sanchuniathon refers to a great wind that merged with its parents, and that connection was called 'Desire' (πόθος):

From its connection, Mot was produced, which some say is mud, and others a putrescence of watery compound; and out of this came every germ of creation and the generation of the universe. So there were certain animals which had no sensation, and out of them grew intelligent animals, and were called "Zophasemin", that is "observers of heaven"; and they were formed like the shape of an egg. Also Mot burst forth into light, and sun, and moon, and stars, and the great constellations.

The form Mot (Μώτ) here is not the same as Muth (Μοὺθ) which appears later.

=== Hebrew scriptures ===
In Hebrew scriptures, Death ("Maweth/Mavet(h)") is sometimes linguistically personified, as in Habakkuk 2:5 and Job 18:13.

== See also ==
- List of Stargate SG-1 characters#Goa'uld#Minor characters
