= Ammonius Grammaticus =

4th century Egyptian priest and tutor

Ammonius Grammaticus (/əˈmoʊniəs/; Ancient Greek: Ἀμμώνιος Γραμματικός; fl. 391) was a 4th-century Egyptian priest.

In 391, he was involved in a violent revolt centred at Alexandria's Serapeum, where the pagan rebels tortured and killed captured Christians. After the suppression of the revolt and the destruction of the temple, Ammonius fled to Constantinople, where he became the tutor of the ecclesiastical historian Socrates.

Ammonius was formerly identified as the author of a treatise titled Peri homoíōn kai diaphórōn léxeōn (περὶ ὁμοίων καὶ διαφόρων λέξεων, On the Differences of Synonymous Expressions). But it seems more probable that the real author was Herennius Philo of Byblus, who was born during the reign of Nero and lived till the reign of Hadrian, and that the treatise in its present form is a revision prepared by a later Byzantine editor, whose name may have been Ammonius.
