= Athenian Greek-Phoenician inscriptions =

Phoenician inscriptions found in Athens, Greece

The Athenian Greek-Phoenician inscriptions are 18 ancient Phoenician inscriptions found in the region of Athens, Greece (also known as Attica). They represent the second largest group of foreign inscriptions in the region after the Thracians (25 inscriptions). 9 of the inscriptions are bilingual Phoenician-Greek and written on steles. Almost all of them bear the indication of the deceased's city of origin, not just the more general designation of their ethnicity, like most other non-Greek inscriptions in the region.

== The bilingual inscriptions ==
=== Athens inscriptions ===
| Dedicated to | Image | Type | Discovered | Date | Current Location | Concordance | | | | | | |
| Dedicated to | Image | Type | Discovered | Date | Current Location | KAI | CIS / RÉS | NE | KI | NSI | TSSI | IG II^{2} |
|---|---|---|---|---|---|---|---|---|---|---|---|---|
| Artemidoros son of Heliodoros of Sidon = Abdtanit, son of Abdshamash, of Sidon | An inscription | Funerary | 1795 | ca. 340 BC | British Museum (BM 1861,0726.1 and 1937,1211.1) | 53 | I 116 | 424,2 | 45 | | III 40 | 10270 |
| Antipatros son of Aphrodisias of Askalon = Shem son of Abdashtart of Askalon | An inscription | Funerary | 1861 | 300s BC | National Archaeological Museum, Athens (NM 1488) | 54 | I 115 | 424,1 | 46 | 32 | | 8388 |
| Benḥudeš, son of 'Abdmilqart, son of 'Abdšamaš, son of TGNṢ of Kition = Noumenios of Citium | An inscription | Funerary | 1794 | ca. 300 BC | Louvre (AO 4834) | 55 | I 117 | 424,3 | 47 | 34 | | 9034 |
| Erene of Byzantium | An inscription | Funerary | 1831 | | Archaeological Museum of Piraeus (3582) | 56 | I 120 | 425,1 | 48 | | | 8440 |

=== Piraeus inscriptions ===
| Dedicated to | Image | Type | Discovered | Date | Current Location | Concordance | | | | | | |
| Dedicated to | Image | Type | Discovered | Date | Current Location | KAI | CIS / RÉS | NE | KI | NSI | TSSI | IG II^{2} |
|---|---|---|---|---|---|---|---|---|---|---|---|---|
| Maḥdaš son of Pene-Simlat of Kition = Noumenios of Kition | An inscription | Funerary | 1884 | 200s BC | | 57 | R 388 | 425,2 | 49 | | | 9035 |
| Askun-Adar | An inscription | Dedication | 1871 | 100 BC | Archaeological Museum of Piraeus | 58 | I 118 | 425,5 | 50 | | | |
| Asept daughter of Esyselemos of Sidon = Asept daughter of Ešmunšillemi of Sidon | An inscription | Funerary | 1841 | 200s BC | Archaeological Museum of Piraeus | 59 | I 119 | 425,3 | 51 | 35 | | 10271 |
| Diopeithes of Sidon = Shema'ba'al son of Magon (Marzēaḥ inscription) | An inscription | Decree | 1887 | ca. 300 BC | Louvre | 60 | R 1215 | 425,4 | 52 | 33 | III 41 | 2946 |
| Abdešmun son of Šallum son of Ab[...] | An inscription | Funerary | 1842 | | Archaeological Museum of Piraeus (3850) | | I 121 | | | | | |

== Bibliography ==
- Baslez, M.-Fr.; Briquel Chatonnet, Fr. (1991). "Un exemple d'intégration phénicienne au monde grec : les Sidoniens au Pirée à la fin du IV^{e} siècle". Atti del II congresso internazionale di Studi fenici e punici, volume 1. Rome. pp. 229–240.
- Briquel-Chatonnet, Françoise (2012). "Les inscriptions phénico-grecques et le bilinguisme des Phéniciens". Comptes rendus des séances de l'Académie des Inscriptions et Belles-Lettres. 156 (1): 619–638. doi:10.3406/crai.2012.93458.
- Hildebrandt, Frank (2006). Die attischen Namenstelen : Untersuchungen zu Stelen des 5. und 4. Jahrhunderts v. Chr. Berlin: Frank & Timme. ISBN 978-3-86596-072-6.
- Pitt, Robert (2022). "Attic Inscriptions in UK Collections. Vol. 4.6. British Museum. Funerary Monuments". AIUK. 4 (6): 37–39.
- Tribulato, Olga (2013). "Phoenician Lions: The Funerary Stele of the Phoenician Shem/Antipatros". Hesperia: The Journal of the American School of Classical Studies at Athens. 82 (3): 459–486. doi:10.2972/hesperia.82.3.0459. ISSN 0018-098X. JSTOR 10.2972/hesperia.82.3.0459. S2CID 192761663.
