= Sakkun =

Phoenician minor god

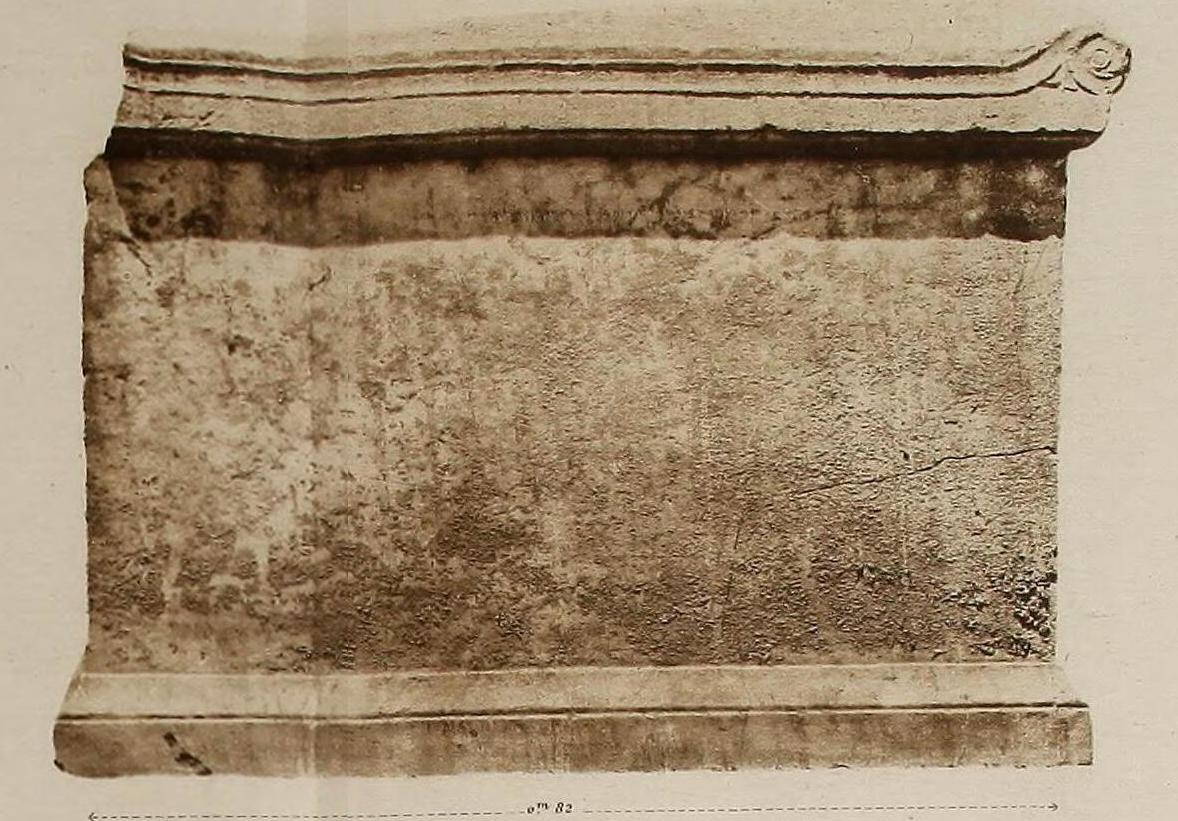
An altar from Piraeus dedicated to ʾskn ʾdr (*Eskun)

Sakkun (Phoenician: 𐤎𐤊𐤍, romanized: skn) was a Phoenician god. He is known chiefly from theophoric names such as Sanchuniathon (𐤎𐤊𐤍𐤉𐤕𐤍 sknytn, variant 𐤔𐤊𐤍𐤉𐤕𐤍 šknytn) and Gisgo (𐤂𐤓𐤎𐤊𐤍 grskn). As of 1940, his earliest appearance in epigraphical evidence is from the 5th century BC.

There is argument that the vocalisation of Phoenician 𐤎𐤊𐤍 (skn) is *Sakkun, that Sakkun is the "administrator" or "superintendent" and that he was identified with Greek Hermes. Albert Baumgartner doubts the arguments: He claims that *Sakun, *Sakkon and *Sakon are likely vocalisations as well, based on comparisons to the Masoretic Niqqud of the Greek name ʾkyš, ancient Latin transliterations of the name (CIL VIII 698, 5099) and Eusebius' variations; He argues that the etymological foundation of a connection between the god skn and the Canaanite noun skn (reconstructed vocalisation *sākinu, after the Canaanite shift *sōkinu) is weak; and he claims that the two evidence that establish the identification with Hermes – the Homeric epithet Σωκος (Sōkos) for Hermes in the Iliad (20, 72) and a Phoenician inscription dedicating an altar to Sakkun (KAI 58) found in Piraeus near one altar dedicated to Hermes and another one to Zeus Soter (and were suggested to be together read as a bilingual inscription) – are both wrong: the epithet is probably derived from the verb σωκέω, and there is no reason to read the inscriptions as one. Philo of Byblos, whose Interpretatio graeca to Phoenician gods is reliable, identifies Hermes with Taautos (= Thoth).
