= Marzēaḥ =

Ancient Northwest Semitic religious and social ceremony and institution

The marzēaḥ was a religious and social ceremony and institution practiced by speakers of Northwest Semitic languages the Levant. The marzēaḥ was related to wine drinking and at least sometimes had a presiding leader or master of ceremonies. Some evidence relates the marzēaḥ to mourning and veneration of the dead, and the nature of this relationship is discussed by scholars; the institution of the marzēaḥ was not necessarily static, and may have changed throughout the many centuries and locations of its existence. Many of the attestations of the marzēaḥ do not provide sufficient context for conclusion about the nature of the ceremony.

== Etymology ==
In the abjads employed for Ugaritic, Biblical Hebrew, Phoenician and Punic, Palmyrene, Nabataean and Imperial Aramaic, the marzēaḥ is spelled mrzḥ. The Ugaritic pronunciation is identified as marziḥu, but the original pattern was *maqtal- (i.e. marzaḥu, as it was pronounced at Emar), and the form marziḥu reflected in some Akkadian language transliterations may be a result of vowel harmony near a guttural. Marzēaḥ (מַרְזֵחַ) is the Tiberian Hebrew pronunciation. The meaning of the Semitic root of the word, rzḥ, is unclear.

== Epigraphic evidence ==
Epigraphic evidence of the marzēaḥ were found in several Northwest Semitic cultures. The earliest known appearance of the marzēaḥ is at the ancient Syrian city of Ebla, written mar-za-u_{9}, in a text that records a sheep brought to what seems to be a feast.

=== Emar ===
One month in the calendar of Emar, known from Akkadian texts and unattested elsewhere, was named Marzaḥānu. The last offering of this month is "brought" by lú.meš mar-za-ḫu (the men of the marzaḥu); the verb "brought" describing an offering is rare in Emar, and this is an indication of a procedure that is peculiar to the role of the marzaḥu. The data concerning the marzaḥu at Emar neither confirms nor discredits a connection with cult for the dead. The month Marzaḥānu was equivalent to Abî (later borrowed as Hebrew Av), with its repeating contact with the ancient Mesopotamian underworld, and this is an important consideration in favor of such connection. The existence of marzaḥu at Emar is probably an influence of regions western to Emar.

=== Ugarit ===
==== In the mythology ====
Among the Ugaritic poems, one text deals with El sacrifices his hunting haul, and invites other deities to the feast while encouraging them to drink and become intoxicated. Meat, bread and wines are served. Yariḫ "moon" in the form of a dog, who was not originally invited, is welcomed by El who recognizes him, but another figure – whose name is not mentioned – is beaten by El who did not recognize him, and it appears that Anat and Astarte are aiding him and preparing weapons. El is then described "sitting in his marzēaḥ" (yṯb b mrzḥh), and becomes drunk. A character named ḥby, who has horns and a tail, mocks El's uncontrolled excesses. The text is damaged from this point onward. El gets drunk in his grief in a text from the Baʿal Cycle as well, but the tablet is very damaged and no new information about the marzēaḥ can be learned from it.

In the Tale of Aqhat, after Aqhat's death, a series of tablets called "Rapiʾūma Texts" is introduced. The Rapiʾūma (who are related to the underworld) are invited to a feast by ỉl mrzʿy (the master of the marzēaḥ ceremony, whose name means "the marzēaḥic god" or "the god of the marzēaḥ"), who is possibly Danel himself, to his house. After a week, the Rapiʾūma arrive at the threshing floors and orchards of Danel, and he offers them summer fruits. The Rapiʾūma and Danel sacrifice a lamb, and possibly other sacrifices. The mourning ceremony is held for Baʿal, probably to help him after a defeat in one of his wars. The Rapiʾūma were called for their ability to contact the dead and see the future, and Anat attends the ceremony as well, and holds the hands of Danel (although she murdered his son Aqhat). Aqhat is conjured by the Rapiʾūma, and they imply that Danel will not be abandoned again. The Rapiʾūma, now described as ġzrm (heroes in war), are asked to bless the name of El, and sacrifice cattle, sheep or rams, calves, and young goat. Then comes the sentence k ksp lʿbrm zt ḫrṣ lʿbrm k š, which was interpreted by A. Horon as "for silver is to the ʿbrm – olive, gold to the ʿbrm – indeed lamb". The ʿbrm are the Rapiʾūma, who get the fruit of the land. The Rapiʾūma got drunk with Danel for seven days, and in the seventh day Baʿal probably arrives; the rest of the texts are damaged and illegible.

The Rapiʾūma were summoned on real occasions as well, as indicated in the accession ritual of Ammurapi, which was compared to the Mesopotamian Kispu ritual) in which the Rapiʾūma were summoned and received sacrifices.

==== In secular texts ====
Four Akkadian texts from Ugarit mention the marzēaḥ. One fragmental text mentions the lú.meš ma-ar-zi-ḫi (the men of the marzēaḥ) in financial context; Nadav Na'aman sees it as a contract, and restores gal before the lú, which creates the phrase rab amēlūti marziḥi "the chief of the marzēaḥ". This corresponds with the Ugaritic title rb.

Another text documents that king Niqmepaʿ, son of Niqmaddu II, confirmed the ownership of the é lú.meš mar-za-i "house of the marzēaḥ-men" to the marzēaḥ-men and their descendants as eternal. This text also says nothing about the actual nature of the marzēaḥ, but it can be learned that the marzēaḥ was legally recognized.

A tablet from the time of Ammittamru II, son of Niqmepaʿ, records that an official took a é lú.meš mar-ze-i ša ša-at-ra-na "house of the marzēaḥ-men of (the god) Šatrana" and gave the marzēaḥ-men another house instead. This tablet uses very similar phrases to that of the time of Niqmepaʿ. A fourth document bears the seal of Padiya king of Siyannu, and deals with a border dispute in a vineyard in Shuksi dedicated to Hurrian Ištar and divided between the marzēaḥ-men of Ari (a village) and the marzēaḥ-men of Siyannu. The marzēaḥ in this case was attached to a geographical location. As in other texts, the marzēaḥ-men are able to possess property, in this case, significant as providing wine.

Evidence was also found in the alphabetic texts: One legal document, KTU^{2} 3.9, records the "marzēaḥ that šmmn established in his house" – this affirms that a private citizen can establish his own marzēaḥ. The men of the marzēaḥ are called mt mrzḥ. It is unclear whether the document was the contract establishing the marzēaḥ with the obligations and rights of the people involved, or a legal suit.

One alphabetic text, KTU^{2} 4.399, is a list of fields and their owners, records bn mrzḥ – the exact meaning is unclear, but the text again indicates the ownership of fields. An extremely damaged tablet, KTU^{2} 4.642, mentions the word mrzḥ more than any other tablet. The level of damage allows minimal context; from the surviving words, it can be reconstructed that the marzēaḥ was mrzḥ ʿn[t] "marzēaḥ of ʿAnat", and the text was also related to wine producing, since šỉr šd kr[m] is mentioned. None of the secular Ugaritic texts mentioning the marzēaḥ confirm or discredit a connection with cult for the dead.

=== Ancient Israel and Judah ===
The marzēaḥ is mentioned in the Hebrew Bible.

Jeremiah 16:5–8:

For thus said YHWH:

Do not enter a house of mourning [בֵּית מַרְזֵחַ bēṯ marzēaḥ],
Do not go to lament and to condole with them; For I have withdrawn My favor from that people —declares YHWH— My kindness and compassion.

Great and small alike shall die in this land, They shall not be buried; no one shall lament them, Nor gash and tonsure themselves for them.

They shall not break bread for a mourner To offer comfort for a death, Nor offer one a cup of consolation For the loss of their father or mother.

Nor shall you enter a house of feasting,

To sit down with them to eat and drink.

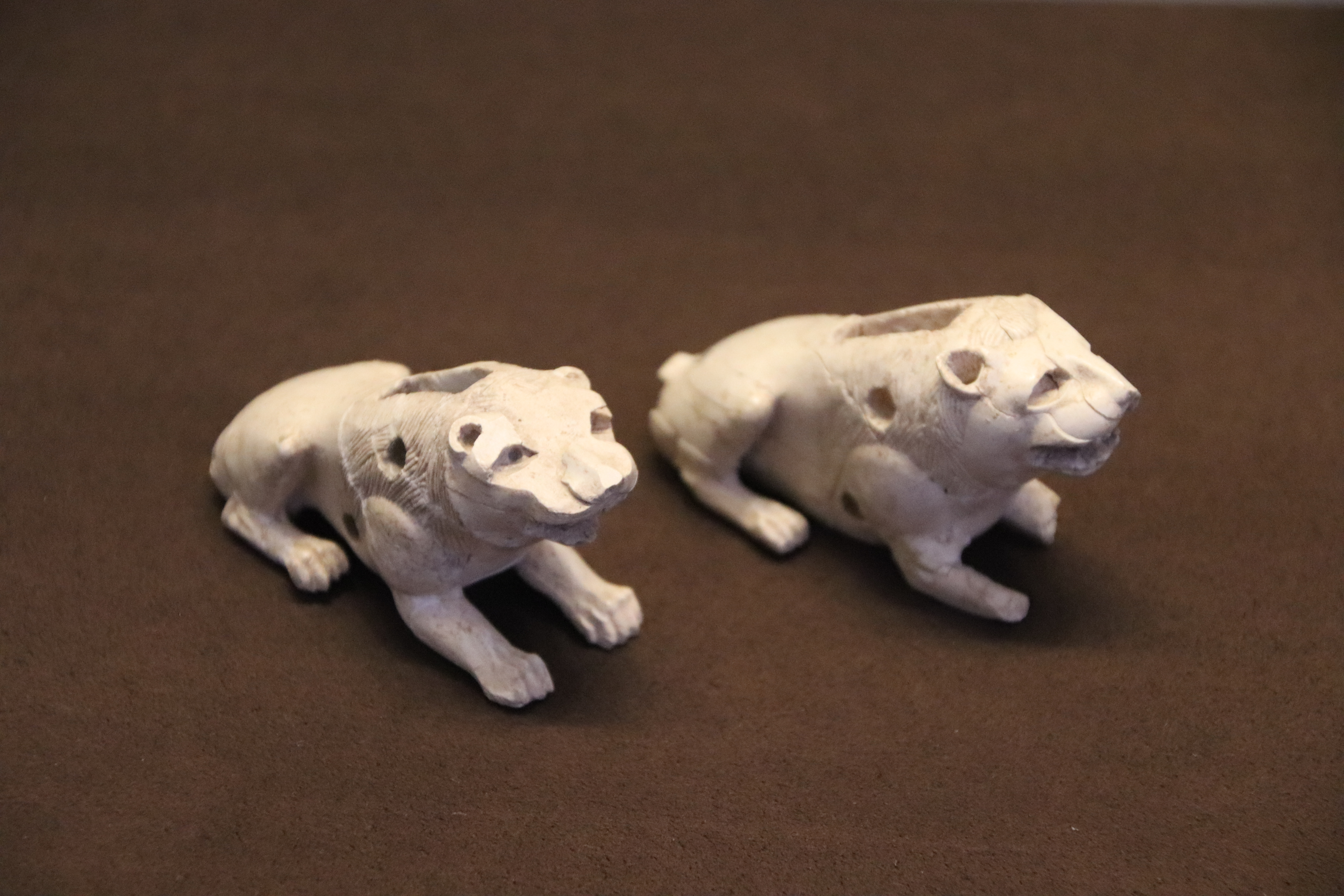
Lion ivory furniture inlays from Samaria ivories, that may be related to the marzēaḥ and the beds of ivory mentioned by Amos

Amos 6:3–7:

Yet you ward off [the thought of] a day of woe

And convene a session of lawlessness.

They lie on ivory beds, Lolling on their couches, Feasting on lambs from the flock And on calves from the stalls.

They hum snatches of song To the tune of the lute— They account themselves musicians like David.

They drink [straight] from the wine bowls And anoint themselves with the choicest oils— But they are not concerned about the ruin of Joseph.

Assuredly, right soon They shall head the column of exiles; They shall loll no more at festive meals [מִרְזַח סְרוּחִים mirzaḥ sərūḥīm].

The Sovereign YHWH wholeheartedly swears: I loathe the Pride of Jacob, And I detest his fortresses. I will declare forfeit city and inhabitants alike

—declares the Lord YHWH, the God of Hosts.

The biblical narrative objects to the marzēaḥ, probably because of its popularity among neighboring nations. Amos' description of the customs was tendentious. The Septuagint translated "house of marzēaḥ" in Jeremiah as θίασον, meaning "mourning feast", and "marzēaḥ of them that stretched themselves" in Amos is translated as χρεμετισμὸς, meaning "horse whinnying", for that was the sound of the drunken debauchery.

=== Moab ===
A legal document of a papyrus from Moab, whose authenticity is sometimes doubted, says: kh . ʾmrw . ʾlhn . lgrʾ . lk . hmrzḥ . whrḥyn . whbyt . wyšʿʾ . rḥq . mhm . wmlkʾ . hšlš "So told the gods to grʾ: for you is the marzēaḥ and the millstone and the house, and yšʿʾ shall be removed from owning them, and the king is a third party". The inscription attests ownership of the marzēaḥ, and it is possible that the house is a marzēaḥ-house.

=== Phoenician homeland and settlements ===
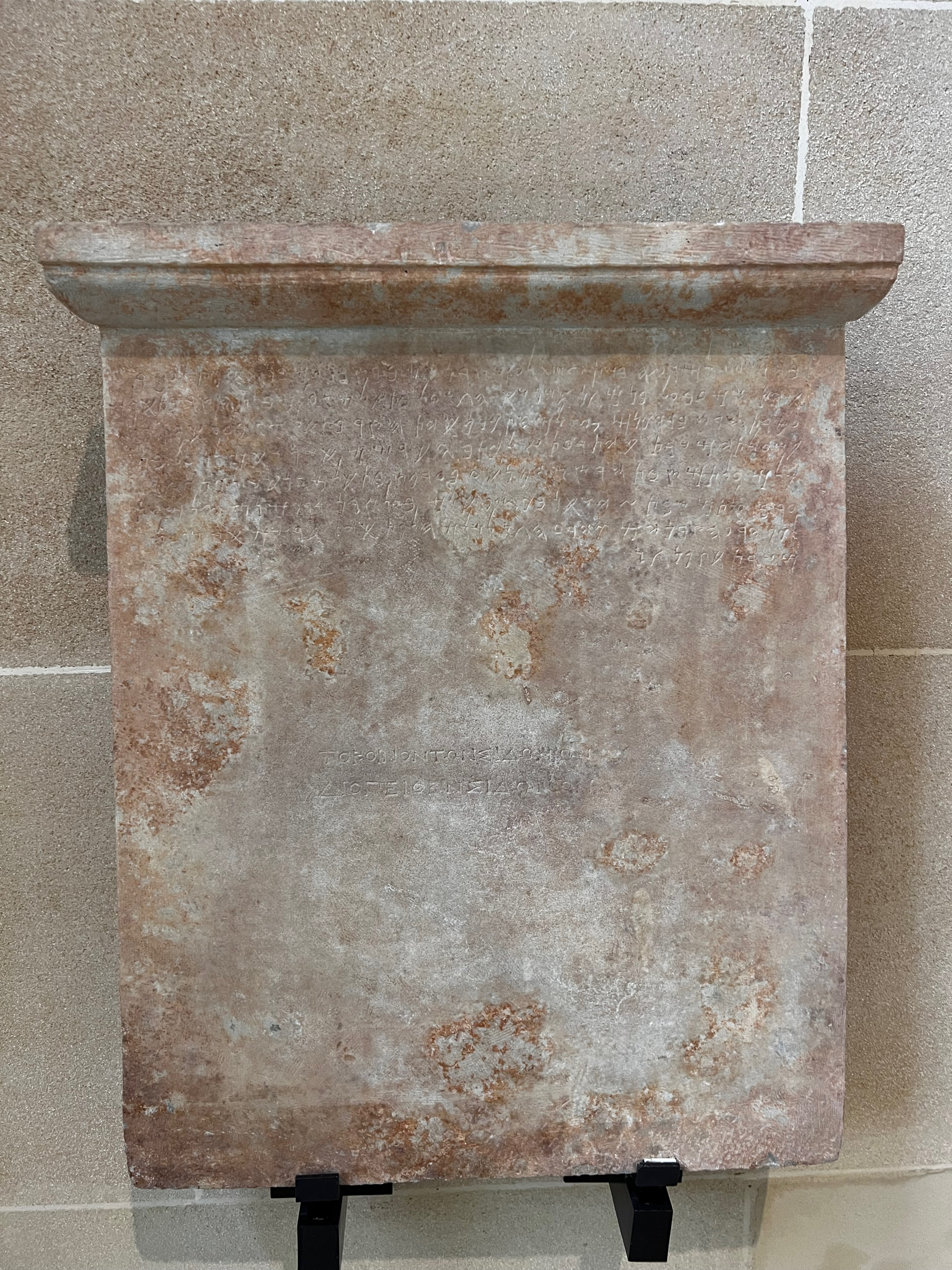
The marzēaḥ Phoenician inscription from Piraeus

A Phoenician inscription on a bronze patera from the market, said to originate from Lebanon and dates to the 5th–3rd centuries BC, dedicates two cups to the marzēaḥ of the solar deity šmš. Among the Athenian Greek-Phoenician inscriptions, one, KAI 60, is dedicated to the donation made by a member of the community for a religious institution "in day 4 of the marzēaḥ in year 14 of the people of Sidon". In the Marseille Tariff, that regulates the prices of sacrifices in the temple of Baʿalṣapon of Jebel Aqra, the "marzēaḥ of the gods" is mentioned, and it may be a holyday similar to the Adonia, or a memorial day for the death or resurrection of the gods. A Phoenician ostrakon from Idalion was inscribed tn lʿštrt wlmlqrt bmrzḥ ʾkl sp/r 1 "Give Astarte and Melqart in the marzēaḥ food: one sp or sr". It seems that the authorities provided the food for the ceremony, but the role of the gods is unclear, as well as whether the marzēaḥ was held in Idalion or Kition, which was the capital city and the cult of Astarte and Melqart in it is well known.

Jane B. Carter compared the syssitia, which sometimes included ancestor tales and poems, to the marzēaḥ. Carter believes that the Phoenicians in Crete held marzēaḥs, and their ceremonies influenced the Hellenic syssitia. She bases her proposal on the focus on ancestor spirits in some Ugaritic texts, and the singing of ancestors tales in the syssitia; the resemblance between Phoenician ivory furniture plaques (which, according to Amos, may have functioned in the marzēaḥ) and the iconography in Cretan building which was used for feasts; the mentioning of the syssitia in both Laconian and Carthaginian constitutions in Aristotle's translation (who refers to the Cretan constitution as similar to the two others), suggesting the original Phoenician term in the Carthaginian constitution was marzēaḥ.

=== Jewish settlement in Elephantine ===
In an Aramaic ostrakon from Elephantine papyri and ostraka, the head of the gravers association asks the addressee to pay his share in the marzēaḥ.

=== Nabataeans ===
The marzēaḥ is mentioned in Nabataean inscriptions in different contexts. The completion of a large agricultural project in Avdat in the time of Rabbel II Soter was celebrated in mrzḥ ʾlhʾ, a banquet holiday for Dushara. In other inscriptions the marzēaḥ is mentioned in the context of mourning, burial and donations to the financing of the marzēaḥ, and the names of the priests and the worshiped god are sometimes recorded; for example: dkyrw ʿbydw bn [...] wḥbrwh mrzḥ ʿbdt ʾlhʾ "Remembered are ʿbydw son of [...] and his friends. marzēaḥ of the gods of Avdat." The conductor of the marzēaḥ, the rb mrzḥʾ, is also attested, and is similar to the 'ỉl mrzʿy from Ugarit. The Nabataean marzēaḥ was influenced by the Greek symposium.

=== Palmyra ===
The majority of the epigraphic evidence for the marzēaḥ comes from the 1st–3rd centuries AD at Palmyra. An inscription dates to Shevat 29 AD mentions nine [bny] mrzḥʾ (literally "[the sons of] the marzēaḥ", meaning "the members of the marzēaḥ"), interpreted as a religious association or status; there were nine of them, and the inscription commemorates the building of an altar for Aglibol and Malakbel. Another inscription, dates to Nisan 118 AD, engraved on a statue of Zebida by his daughter and another man for his "leadership of the marzēaḥ of the priests of Bel" (rbnwt mrzḥwth dy kmry bl). A bilingual inscription from Nisan 203 AD translates the Palmyrene leadership of the marzēaḥ (rbnwt mrzḥwt or rbnwt mrzḥwtʾ) to Greek as συ[μποσια]ρχος (sy[mposia]rch). A fourth inscription from Tishri 243 AD for a leader of the marzēaḥ who "served the gods and presided over the divination for a whole year and provided the priests with old wine for a whole year" ends with blessings for his sons, the scribe, the person in charge of the cooking, the cupbearer (mmzgʾ) and other assistants. About six tesserae are depicted on one side a priest on a couch under a vine, and on the other side inscribed with a title "head (rb) of the marzēaḥ"; one of them shows nude Apollo and mentions the members of the marzēaḥ of Nabu (bny mrzḥ nbw). As the Nabataean marzēaḥ, the Palmyrene marzēaḥ was influenced by the Greek Symposium.

=== Late antiquity ===
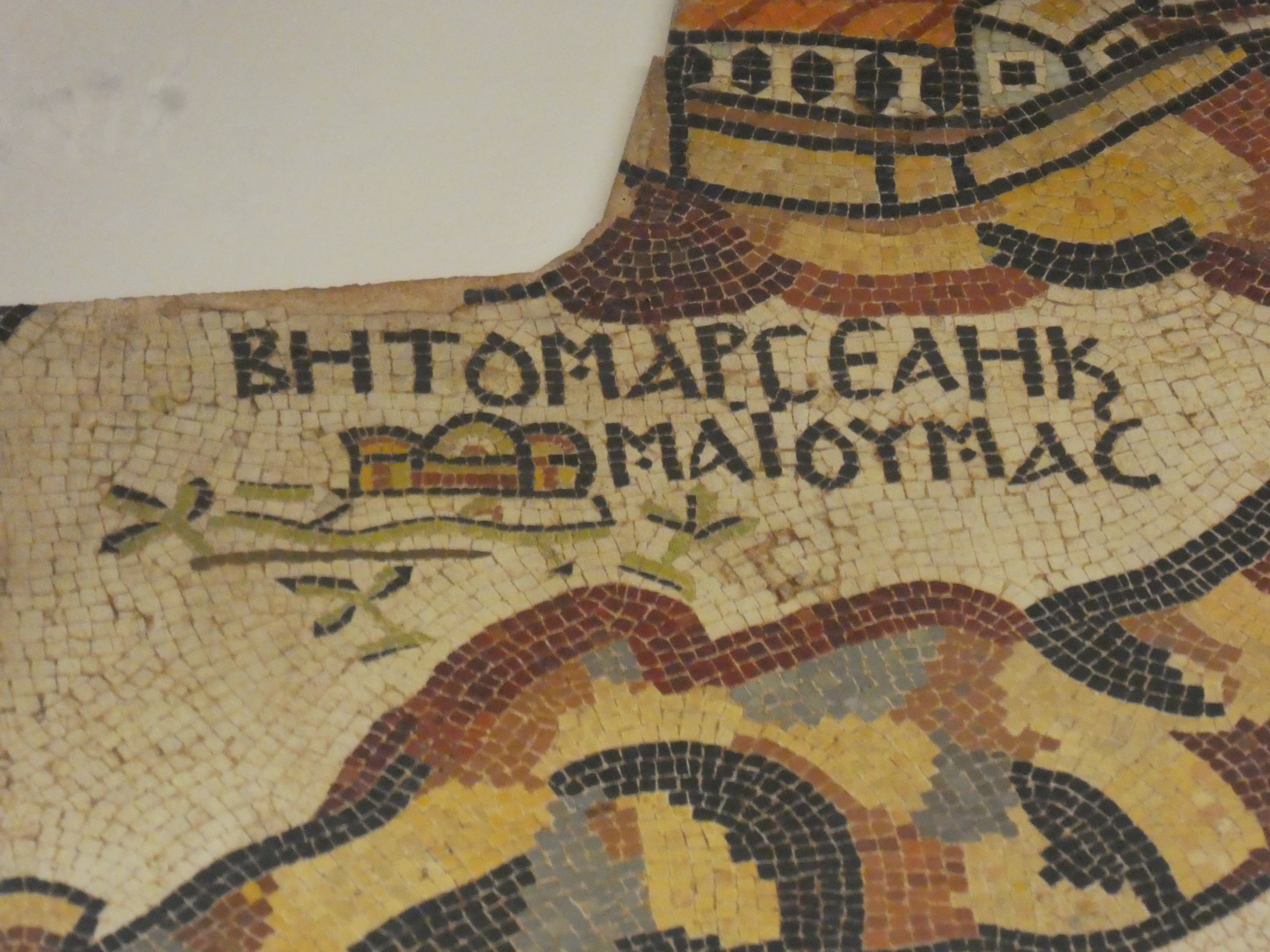
Betomarsea in Madaba map

The Talmud discusses the marzēaḥ as a living institution. The latest reference to the marzēaḥ is the Madaba Map from the 6th century AD: the settlement ΒΗΤΟΜΑΡΣΕΑ Η ΚΑΙ ΜΑΙΟΥΜΑΣ (Bētomarsea ē kai Maioumas) shown in the map near the Dead Sea is identified as "House of Marzēaḥ". Some link this place to Baʿal-Peʿor in Numbers 31, who is the god of death.
