= Hierombalus =

Hierombalus (Ancient Greek: Ίερομβάλος) was a priest of Ieuo, mentioned in Sanchuniathon's mythistory, known only through later historian Philo of Byblos via early Christian writer Eusebius. Philo emphasizes the reliability of Sanchuniathon's historical account of the Jews by explaining that Sanchuniathon got his information from Hierombalus, who was a priest of the god Ieuo (Yahweh) and that Hierombalus dedicated his work to Abibalus, the king of Berytus, and was endorsed by the king's scholars.

The name Hierombalus (or -os) has been equated with Jerubba'al/Gideon, Hiram or Yerem-Ba'al, an equivalent of Jeremiah. Early commenters saw a problem with the Ba'al-theophoric name: "How can one imagine a priest of YHWH writing for the king of Beirut at the time of the Trojan War?" Baumgarten saw nothing preventing it.

== Bibliography ==
- Albright, William Foxwell (1957). From the Stone Age to Christianity : Monotheism and the Historical Process (2nd ed.). Garden City, N.Y: Doubleday. OCLC 1239794622.
- Baumgartner, Albert I. (1981). The Phoenician History of Philo of Byblos: A Commentary. Etudes préliminaires aux religions orientales dans l'Empire romain - Tome 89. Leiden: Brill. ISBN 9789004063693. OCLC 8016911.
- Edwards, M. J. (1991). "Philo or Sanchuniathon? A Phoenicean Cosmogony". The Classical Quarterly. 41 (1): 213–220. doi:10.1017/S0009838800003670. ISSN 1471-6844.
- Gray, John (1953). "The God Yw in the Religion of Canaan". Journal of Near Eastern Studies. 12 (4): 278–283. doi:10.1086/371162.
- van Kooten, George H. (2006). "Moses/Musaeus/Mochos and his God Yahweh, Iao, and Sabaoth, seen from a GraecoRoman perspective". The Revelation of the Name YHWH to Moses (PDF). Themes in Biblical Narrative. Vol. 9. Leiden: Brill. ISBN 9789004153981. Archived (PDF) from the original on 19 February 2024.
- Lokkegaard, F. (1954). "Some comments on the Sanchuniathon tradition". Studia Theologica. 8 (8): 51–76. doi:10.1080/00393385408599749.
- Philo of Byblos (1981). The Phoenician history. Introduction, Critical Text, Translation, Notes by Harold W. Attridge and Robert A. Oden, Jr. Washington: The Catholic Biblical Association of America. ISBN 0-915170-08-6 – via Internet Archive.
