= Sanchuniathon =

Phoenician writer/historian

- 𐤎𐤊𐤍𐤉𐤕𐤍
- Born: Unknown; Berytus (Beirut), Phoenicia
- Died: Unknown; Unknown
- Occupation: Author
- Writing career
- Language: Phoenician
- Period: Hellenistic and Roman era OR Trojan War era
- Genres: Historical and religious writings
- Notable work: Phoenician History

Sanchuniathon (/ˌsæŋkjʊˈnaɪəˌθɒn/; Ancient Greek: Σαγχουνιάθων, romanized: Sankhouniáthōn, or Σαγχωνιάθων, Sankhōniáthōn; probably from Phoenician: 𐤎𐤊𐤍𐤉𐤕𐤍, romanized: *Saḵūnyatān, "Sakkun has given", variant 𐤔𐤊𐤍𐤉𐤕𐤍 šknytn), also known as Sanchoniatho the Berytian, was a Phoenician author. His three works, originally written in the Phoenician language, survive only in partial paraphrase and a summary of a Greek translation by Philo of Byblos recorded by the Christian bishop Eusebius. These few fragments comprise the most extended literary source concerning Phoenician religion in either Greek or Latin: Phoenician sources, along with all of Phoenician literature, were lost with the parchment on which they were written.

== The author ==
All knowledge of Sanchuniathon and his work comes from the Praeparatio Evangelica of Eusebius (I. chs ix-x), which contains some information about him, along with the only surviving excerpts from his writing, as summarized and quoted from his purported translator, Philo of Byblos.

Eusebius quotes neo-Platonist writer Porphyry as stating that Sanchuniathon of Berytus (Beirut) wrote the truest history because he obtained records from Hierombalus priest of Ieuo (Ancient Greek: Ἰευώ), that Sanchuniathon dedicated his history to Abibalus (Abibaal) king of Berytus, and that it was approved by the king and other investigators, the date of this writing being before the Trojan War (around 1200 BC) approaching close to the time of Moses, "when Semiramis was queen of the Assyrians." Thus Sanchuniathon is placed firmly in the mythic context of the pre-Homeric Greek Heroic Age, an antiquity from which no other Greek or Phoenician writings are known to have survived to the time of Philo.

Sanchuniathon claims to have based his work on "collections of secret writings of the Ammouneis discovered in the shrines", sacred lore deciphered from mystic inscriptions on the pillars which stood in the Phoenician temples, lore which exposed the truth—later covered up by allegories and myths—that the gods were originally human beings who came to be worshipped after their deaths and that the Phoenicians had taken what were originally names of their kings and applied them to elements of the cosmos (compare euhemerism), worshipping forces of nature and the sun, moon, and stars. Eusebius cites Sanchuniathon in his attempt to discredit pagan religion based on such foundations.

This rationalizing euhemeristic slant and the emphasis on Beirut, a city of great importance in the late classical period but apparently of little importance in ancient times, suggests that the work itself is not nearly as old as it claims to be. Some have suggested it was forged by Philo himself or assembled from various traditions and presented within an authenticating pseudepigraphical format to give the material a patina of believability. Philo may have translated genuine Phoenician works ascribed to an ancient writer known as Sanchuniathon but in fact written in more recent times. This judgment is echoed by the Encyclopædia Britannica Eleventh Edition, which described Sanchuniathon as "belong[ing] more to legend than to history."

Not all readers have taken such a critical view:

The Humour which prevail'd with several learned Men to reject Sanchoniatho as a counterfeit because they knew not what to make of him, his Lordship always blam'd. Philo Byblius, Porphyry, and Eusebius, who were better able to judge than any Moderns, never call in question his being genuine.

— Squier Payne, in a preface to Richard Cumberland's Sanchoniatho's Phoenician History (1720)

However that may be, much of what has been preserved in this writing, despite the euhemeristic interpretation given it, turned out to be supported by the Ugaritic mythological texts excavated at Ras Shamra (ancient Ugarit) in Syria since 1929; Otto Eissfeldt demonstrated in 1952 that it does incorporate genuine Phoenician elements that can now be related to the Ugaritic texts, some of which, as shown in extant versions of Sanchuniathon, remained unchanged since the second millennium BC. The modern consensus is that Philo's treatment of Sanchuniathon offered a Hellenistic view of Phoenician materials written between the time of Alexander the Great and the first century BC, if it was not a literary invention of Philo.

== The work ==
In surviving fragments of the text, it can be difficult to ascertain whether Eusebius is citing Philo's translation of Sanchuniathon or speaking in his own voice. Another difficulty is the substitution of Greek proper names for Phoenician ones and the possible corruption of some Phoenician names that do appear.

=== Philosophical creation story ===
A philosophical creation story traced to "the cosmogony of Taautus, whom Philo explicitly identifies with the Egyptian Thoth—"the first who thought of the invention of letters, and began the writing of records"—which begins with Erebus and Wind, between which Eros 'Desire' came to be. From this was produced Môt 'Death' but which the account says may mean 'mud'. In a mixed confusion, the germs of life appear, and intelligent animals called Zophasemin (probably best translated 'observers of heaven') formed together as an egg. The account is not clear. Then Môt burst forth into light and the heavens were created and the various elements found their stations.

=== Allegorical culture heroes ===
Various descendants are listed, many of whom have allegorical names but are described in the quotations from Philo as mortals who first made particular discoveries or who established particular customs.

According to the text, the wind Colpias and his wife Baau (translated as Nyx 'Night') give birth to mortals Aeon, who discovered food from trees, and Protogonus 'firstborn'); The immediate descendants of these were Genus and Genea, who dwelt in Phoenicia; "and ... when droughts occurred, they (Genus and Genea) stretched out their hands to heaven towards the sun; for him alone (he says) they regarded as god the Lord of Heaven, calling him Beelsamen, which is in the Phoenician language 'lord of heaven', and in Greek 'Zeus.'" (Eusebius, I, x). Genus and Genea give birth to hôs, Pûr, and Phlox.

=== The history of the gods ===
The work includes a genealogy and history of various northwest Semitic deities who were widely worshipped. Many are listed in the genealogy under the names of their counterparts in the Greek pantheon, Hellenized forms of their Semitic names, or both. The additional names given for some of these deities appear usually in parentheses in the table below. Only equations made in the text appear here, but many of the hyperlinks point to the northwest Semitic deities that are probably intended. See the notes below the table for translations of the unlinked and several other names.

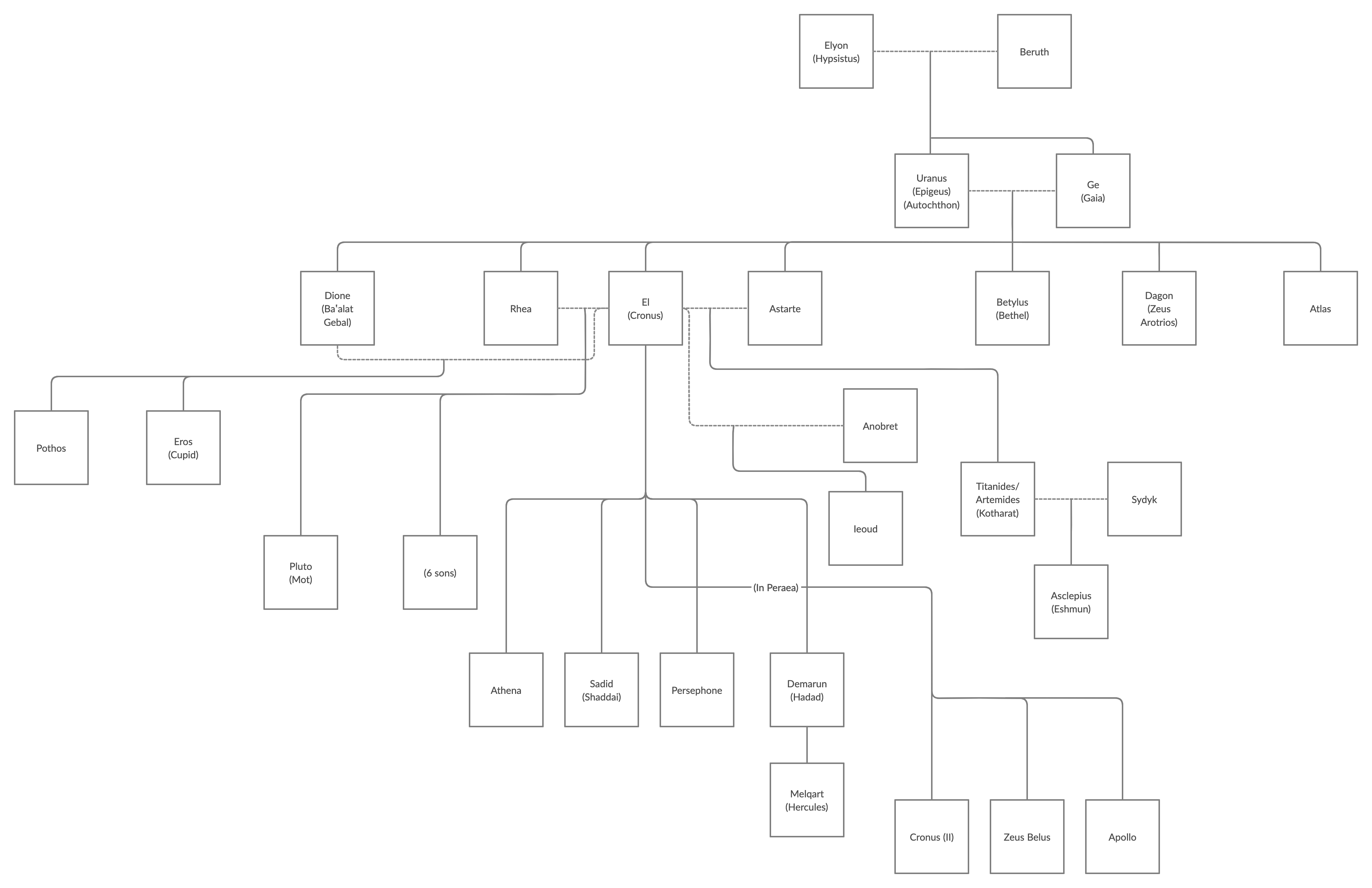

Translations of Greek forms: arotrios, 'of husbandry, farming', autochthon (for autokhthon) 'produced from the ground', epigeius (for epigeios) 'from the earth', eros 'desire', ge 'earth', hypsistos 'most high', pluto (for plouton) 'wealthy', pontus (for pontos) 'sea', pothos 'longing', siton 'grain', thanatos 'death', uranus (for ouranos) 'sky'. Notes on etymologies: Anobret: proposed connections include ʿyn = "spring", by Renan ("Memoire", 281), and to ʿAnat rabbat = "Lady ʿAnat" by Clemen (Die phönikische Religion, 69–71); Ieoud/Iedud: perhaps from a Phoenician cognate of Hebrew yḥyd = "only" or of Hebrew ydyd = "beloved".

According to the text, as in the Greek and Hittite theogonies, Sanchuniathon's El/Elus/Ilus/Cronus overthrows his father Sky or Uranus and castrates him, and surrounded his habitation with a wall, and founded Byblos, the first city of Phoenicia. However, Zeus Demarûs (that is, Hadad Ramman), who is the father of Melqart/Melicarthus (Heracles), purported son of Dagon but actually son of Uranus. When Uranus made war against Pontus, Zeus Demarûs invaded Pontus and joins with Uranus, although he (Zeus Demarûs) later vowed a sacrifice for his escape and Pontus put him to flight.

To El/Cronus is attributed the practice of circumcision. Twice, it says that El/Cronus sacrificed his own son: called Ieoud, Idoud, or Iedod in variant manuscripts. (Olyan says they reflect *yahid, "only son" or *yadid, "beloved.")

According to the text, El/Cronus, having laid an ambuscade for his father Uranus in a certain place situated in the middle of the earth, when he had got him into his hands dismembered him over against the fountains and rivers. There Uranus was consecrated, and his spirit was separated, and the blood of his parts flowed into the fountains and the waters of the rivers; and the place, which was the scene of this transaction, is shewed even to this day.

At some point, peace is made, and Zeus Adados (Hadad) and Astarte reign over the land with Cronus' permission. An account of the events is written by the Cabeiri and by Asclepius (Eshmun), under Thoth's direction.

=== About serpents ===
A passage about serpent worship follows in which it is not clear what part is from Sanchuniathon and what part from Philo of Byblus:

The nature then of the dragon and of serpents Tauthus himself regarded as divine, and so again after him did the Phoenicians and Egyptians: for this animal was declared by him to be of all reptiles most full of breath, and fiery. In consequence of which it also exerts an unsurpassable swiftness by means of its breath, without feet and hands or any other of the external members by which the other animals make their movements. It also exhibits forms of various shapes, and in its progress makes spiral leaps as swift as it chooses. It is also most long-lived, and its nature is to put off its old skin, and so not only to grow young again, but also to assume a larger growth; and after it has fulfilled its appointed measure of age, it is self-consumed, in like manner as Tauthus himself has set down in his sacred books: for which reason this animal has also been adopted in temples and in mystic rites.

== On the Phoenician Alphabet ==
A further work of Sanchuniathon noted by Eusebius (P.E. 1.10.45) is a treatise On the Phoenician Alphabet.

== See also ==
- Ancient Canaanite religion
- Phoenician religion

== Bibliography ==
- Renan, Ernest (1858). Mémoire sur l'origine et le caractère véritable de l'histoire phénicienne qui porte le nom de Sanchoniathon. Mémoires de l'Académie des inscriptions et belles-lettres (in French). Imprimerie impériale.
- Attridge, H. W.; Oden, Jr., R. A. (1981). Philo of Byblos: The Phoenician History: Introduction, Critical Text, Translation, Notes. CBQMS. Vol. 9. Washington: D. C.: The Catholic Biblical Association of America.
- Baumgarten, Albert Irwin (1981). The Phoenician History of Philo of Byblos: a Commentary. EPRO. Vol. 89. Leiden: E. J. Brill.
- Ebach, Jürgen (1978). Weltentstehung und Kulturentwicklung bei Philo von Byblos. Beiträge zur Wissenschaft vom Alten und Neuen Testament (in German). Vol. 108. Stuttgart, Berlin, Köln, Mainz: Kohlhammer Verlag.
- Lipiński, E. (1983). "The 'Phoenician History,' of Philo of Byblos". Bibliotheca Orientalis. 40: 305–310.
