= Philo of Byblos =

Greek author (c. 64 – 141)

Philo of Byblos (Ancient Greek: Φίλων Βύβλιος, Phílōn Býblios; Latin: Philo Byblius; c. 64 – 141), also known as Herennius Philon, was an antiquarian writer of grammatical, lexical and historical works in Greek. He is chiefly known for his Phoenician history assembled from the writings of Sanchuniathon.

== Life ==
Philo was born in the 1st century in Byblos in what is now Lebanon. "He lived into the reign of Hadrian, of which he wrote a history, now lost." His name "Herennius" suggests that he was a client of the consul suffectus Herennius Severus through whom Philo may have achieved the status of a Roman citizen.

== Works ==
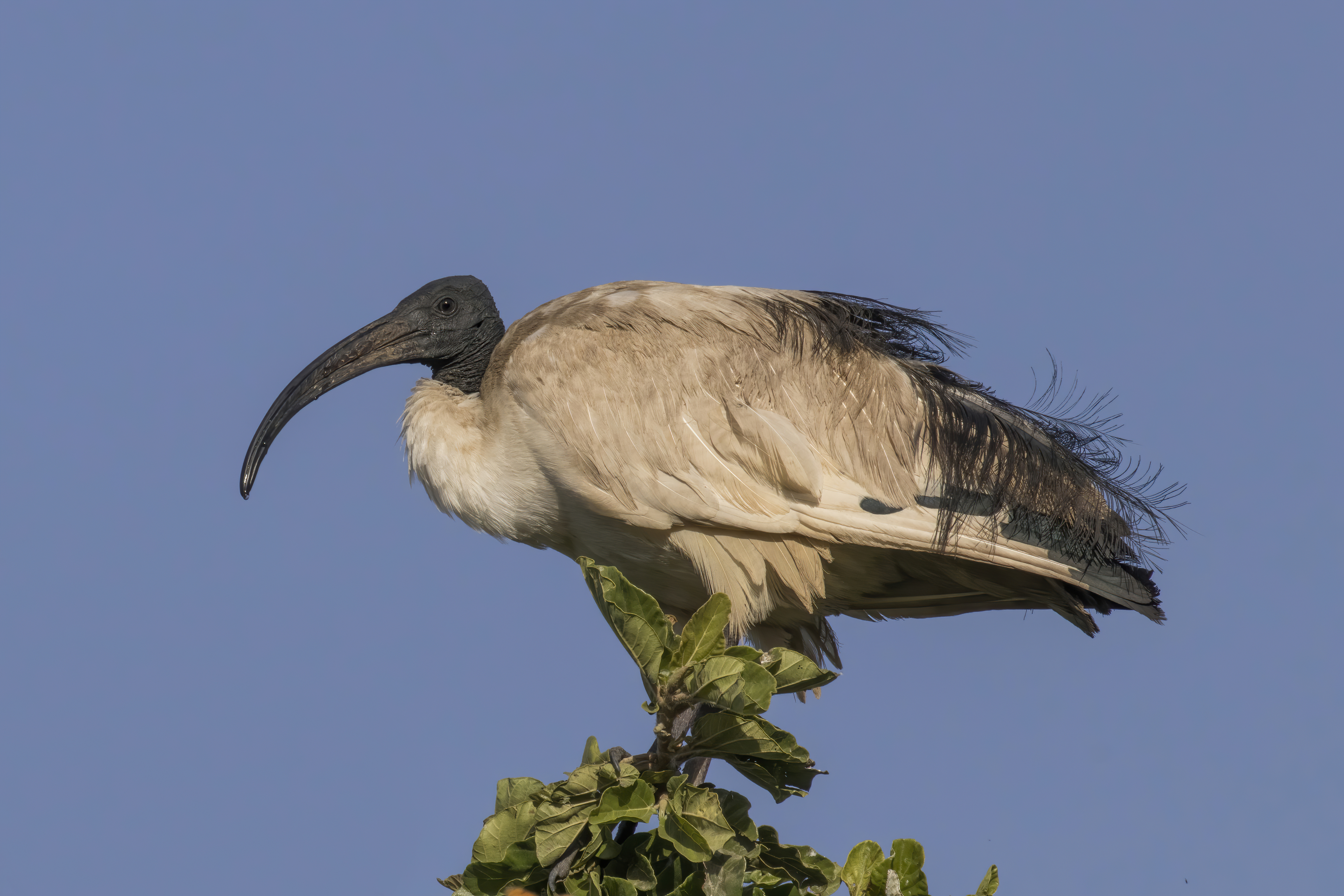
Thoth appears with the head of the African sacred ibis and is mentioned frequently by Philo.

Philo wrote a dictionary of synonyms, a collection of scientific writers and their works organized by category, a catalogue of cities with their famous citizens, and a Vita of the Emperor Hadrian. Some of his work is known to us by titles only; others have survived in fragmentary quotes in Christian authors. Among his works were:

- On the Acquisition and Choice of Books
- On Cities and their Famous Men, epitomized by the grammarian Aelius Serenus, and one of the chief authorities used by Hesychius and Stephanus of Byzantium
- On Synonyms, of which there is extant an epitome by Ammonius Grammaticus.

[H]e is chiefly known for his translation of the Phoenician history of Sanchuniathon, who was said to have lived before the Trojan war. Of this work considerable fragments have been preserved, chiefly by Eusebius in the Praeparatio evangelica (i.9; iv.16). They present a euhemeristic réchauffé of Phoenician theology and mythology, which is represented as translated from the original Phoenician.

Sanchuniathon was thought by some scholars to be "an imaginary personage, whose name is formed from that of the Phoenician god Sanchon". However, Edinburgh Professor P. B. R. Forbes wrote that 14th-century BC documents from Ugarit, published since 1929, have "proved conclusively that Sanchuniathon is doubtless a verity because of the many correspondences between him and these fresh texts".

Philo's Greek Phoenician History titled the Phoenicica (Koine Greek: Φοινικικά, Phoinikiká) was so extensively quoted by Eusebius in his 4th-century work Praeparatio evangelica that the fragments have been assembled and translated. Eusebius's quotations often have an agenda contrary to Philo's original intentions: the sources of Phoenician religion are quoted to disparage. Philo's passages show a jumbling together of Phoenician lore with Greek mythology, Zoroastrian beliefs and ancient Egyptian beliefs concerning the ibis-headed god Thoth, who in Philo is called Taautos or Tauthos. In Philo, as among the ancient Egyptians, Taautos/Thoth is given characteristics that were much argued in the 4th century Christology: "everlasting, unbegotten, undivided". Allusions to serpent veneration mingled with the cult of Thoth are also found.

According to Eusebius, Philo discovered secret mythological writings of the ancient Phoenicians assembled by the Phoenician writer Sanchuniathon who, according to Eusebius/Philo, transcribed the sacred lore from pillars in the temples of Byblos. Philo also translated all (or some) of the work in his Phoenician History. According to Porphyry, Sanchuniathon wrote a history of the Jews based on information derived from Hierombalus (i.e. Jeruba'al), a Yahwist priest, and dedicated it to Abelbal or Abibal, king of Berytus.

The sequence of the gods and their genealogy among the Phoenicians, as gleaned from Philo's quoted fragments, were for long recognized as supporting the general scheme in Hesiod's Theogony. Names of deities on the cuneiform tablets from Ugarit (modern Ras Shamra, Syria) fall into similar patterns. Compare the genealogical tables at Sanchuniathon.
