= Canaanite religion =

Group of ancient Semitic religions

- Classification: Ancient Semitic religion
- Region: Land of Ancient Canaan in the southern Levant
- Origin: c. 3rd millennium BCE
- Separations: Yahwism, Punic religion

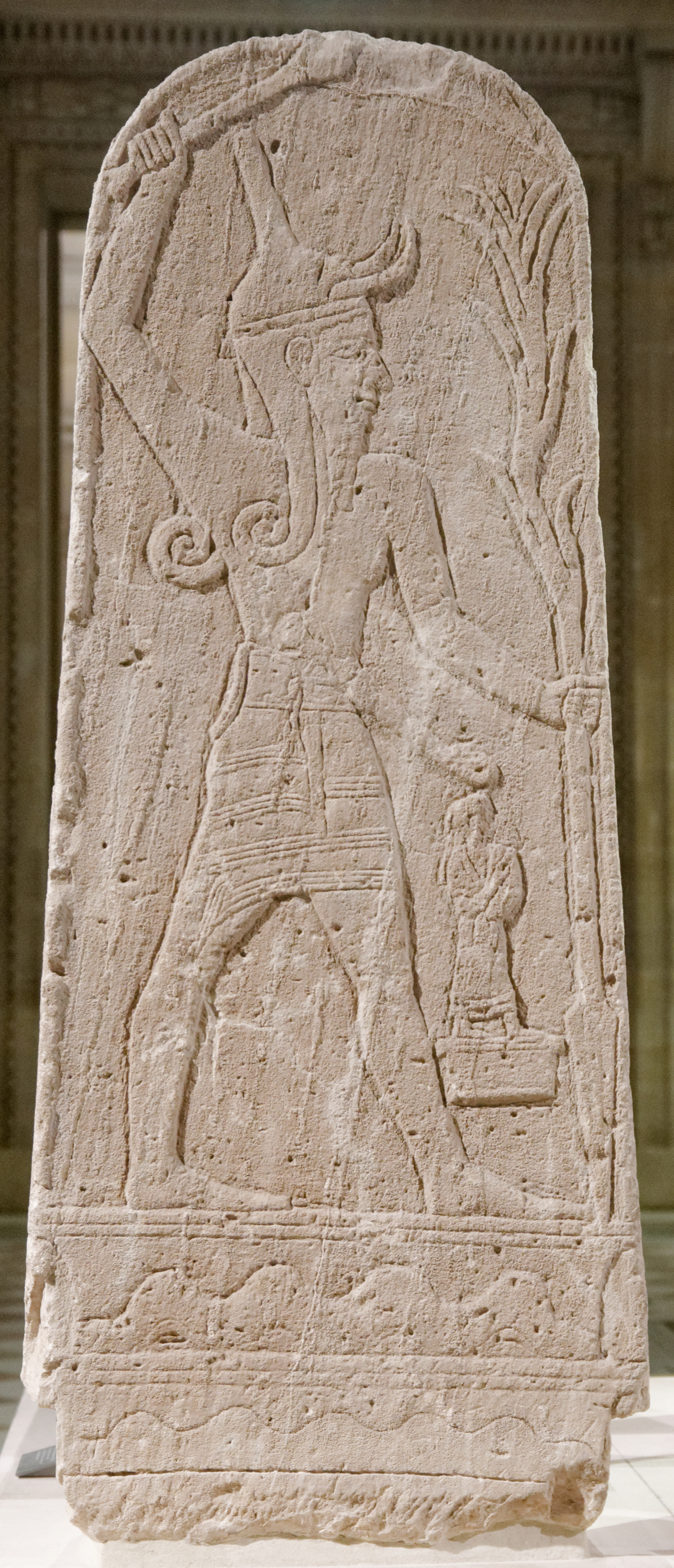
Ba'al with Thunderbolt stele from Ugarit, c. 15th century BCE

The religion and mythic beliefs of the people in the land of Canaan in the southern Levant during approximately the first three millennia BCE were polytheistic and in some cases monolatristic. They were influenced by neighboring cultures, particularly ancient Egyptian and Mesopotamian religious practices. The pantheon was headed by the god El and his consort Asherah, with other significant deities including Baal, Anat, Astarte, Dagon, and Rešep.

Canaanite religious practices included animal sacrifice, veneration of the dead, and the worship of deities through shrines and sacred groves. The religion also featured a complex mythology, including stories of divine battles and cycles of death and rebirth. Archaeological evidence, particularly from sites like Ugarit, and literary sources, including the Ugaritic texts and the Hebrew Bible, have provided most of the current knowledge about Canaanite religion.

== History ==
Knowledge about the Canaanite religions is fragmentary and insufficient to construct a complete and continuous account. Prior to the emergence of Levantine archaeology in the late 19th and early 20th century, the knowledge of Canaanite religion came mostly from the accounts of the Hebrew Bible. This was supplemented by some secondary and tertiary Greek sources (Lucian's On the Syrian Goddess, fragments of the Phoenician History of Philo of Byblos, and the writings of Damascius). Present-day knowledge of Canaanite religion comes primarily from archaeological discoveries of literary sources and material remains linked to Canaanite religion.

=== Third and second millennia BCE ===
The literary sources appear in the form of ancient texts, uncovered in archaeological excavations. The earliest evidence of Canaanite religions come from the Ebla tablets, a series of texts inscribed on clay, found at Tell Mardikh, Syria and dated to the second half of the 3rd millennium BCE. They include lists of offerings to primary deities of the Canaanite pantheon (El, Baal and Dagon). In the late 3rd millennium to early 2nd millennium BCE, the same Canaanite deities appear in personal theophoric name of Amorite people, whose homeland was located in the middle Euphrates and lower Khabur regions of northwest Syria. Additional light is shed by inscriptions of Idrimi, the 15th century BCE king of Alalakh and the 14th–13th century BCE tablets of Emar. By far the most substantial source of information is the Ugaritic texts, found near Ras Shamra, Syria (ancient Ugarit), dated around 1275 BCE. Over three hundred of these texts attest to key Canaanite myths and legends, as well as incantations, prayers, hymns, votive texts, deity lists, festival catalogs, lists of sacrifices, ritual prescriptions or descriptions, liturgies, and omen texts.

=== First millennium BCE ===
During the first millennium BCE, several distinct branches of Canaanite religion persisted. While the Hebrew Bible distinguishes Yahwism, practiced in the kingdoms of Israel and Judah, from Canaanite religion, many scholars classify it as one of the Canaanite religions, and Israelites as being a Canaanite people. Limited sources for religion in other parts of the Southern Levant, such as Mesha Stele (c. 850 BCE) from the land of Moab and the Deir Alla inscription (c. 700 BCE) with its unique dialect. In the broader region of Syria, Aramean religion is attested by sources such as the Tell Fekherya bilingual inscription (9th century BCE), Stele of Zakkur (c. 775 BCE), Sefire steles (before c. 740 BCE) and the Hadad Statue (mid 8th century BCE). Phoenician religion is attested by texts discovered in and around modern Lebanon, such as the Yehimilk inscription (10th century BCE), the Karatepe bilingual (c. 720 BCE) and the Yehawmilk Stele (5th–4th century BCE).

Throughout the Hellenistic period, in the non-Jewish parts of Canaan, Greek religion spread alongside pre-existing Canaanite traditions rather than replacing them. There were plenty of similarities between both religions, and through a process of syncretism, Canaanite deities were given the names of the Greek equivalents.

As the Phoenicians colonized the western Mediterranean (Punic people), there are also many texts attesting to Punic religion, such as the Carthage Tariff and Marseille Tariff (c. 200 BCE). While the Punic religion was a direct continuation of the Phoenician branch, significant local differences developed over the centuries following the foundation of Carthage and other Punic communities elsewhere in North Africa, southern Spain, Sardinia, western Sicily, and Malta from the 9th century BCE onward. After the conquest of these regions by the Roman Republic in the 3rd and 2nd centuries BCE, Punic religious practices continued, surviving until the 4th century CE in some cases.

== Beliefs ==
=== Afterlife beliefs and cult of the dead ===
Canaanites believed that following physical death, the npš (usually translated as "soul") departed from the body to the land of Mot (Death). Bodies were buried with grave goods. Offerings of food and drink were made to the dead to ensure that they would not trouble the living. Dead relatives were venerated and sometimes asked for help.

=== Cosmology ===
None of the inscribed tablets found since 1928 in the Canaanite city of Ugarit (destroyed c. 1200 BCE) has revealed a cosmology. Syntheses are nearly impossible without Hierombalus and Philo of Byblos (c. 64–141 CE) via Eusebius, before and after much Greek and Roman influence in the region.

According to the pantheon, known in Ugarit as 'ilhm (elohim) or the children of El, supposedly obtained by Philo of Byblos from Sanchuniathon of Berythus (Beirut), the creator was known as Elion, who was the father of the divinities, and in the Greek sources he was married to Beruth (Beirut meaning 'the city'). This marriage of the divinity with the city has parallels with the stories of the link between Melqart and Tyre; Chemosh and Moab; Tanit and Baal Hammon in Carthage; Yah and Jerusalem.

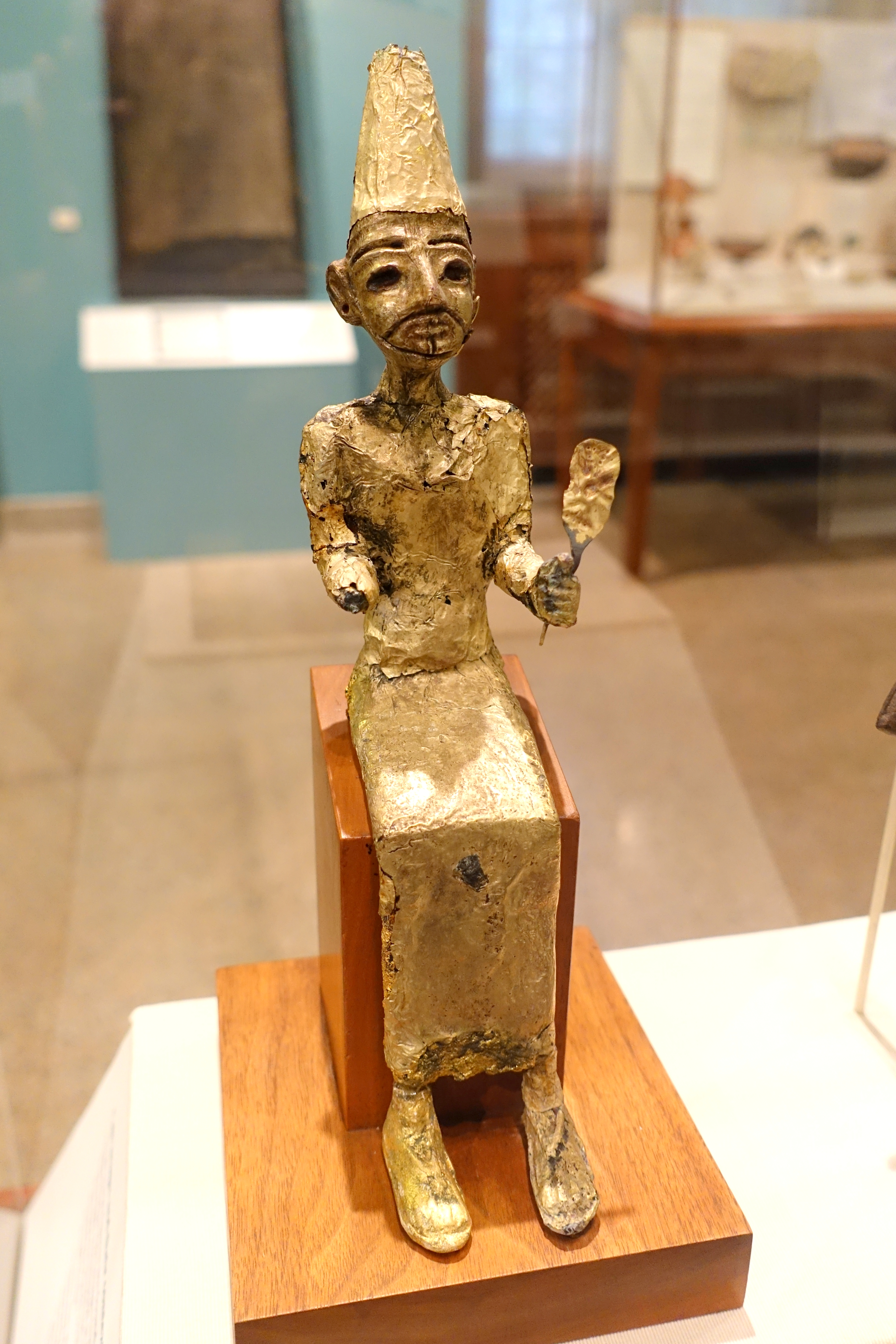
Putative statuette of El (c. 1400–1200 BCE) from Tel Megiddo in northern Israel

In Canaanite mythology there were twin mountains as a recurring motif. W. F. Albright, for example, says that El Shaddai is a derivation of a Semitic stem that appears in the Akkadian shadû ('mountain') and shaddā'û or shaddû'a ('mountain-dweller'), one of the names of Amurru. Philo of Byblos states that Atlas was one of the elohim, which would clearly fit into the story of El Shaddai as "God of the Mountain(s)". Harriet Lutzky has presented evidence that Shaddai was an attribute of a Semitic goddess, linking the epithet with Hebrew šad, 'breast', as "the one of the breast". The idea of two mountains being associated here as the breasts of the Earth, fits into the Canaanite mythology quite well. The ideas of pairs of mountains seem to be quite common in Canaanite mythology. The late period of this cosmology makes it difficult to tell what influences (Roman, Greek, or Hebrew) may have informed Philo's writings.

=== Mythology ===
In the Baal Cycle, Ba'al Hadad is challenged by and defeats Yam using two magical weapons (called "Driver" and "Chaser") made for him by Kothar-wa-Khasis. Afterward, with the help of Athirat and Anat, Ba'al persuades El to allow him a palace. El approves, and the palace is built by Kothar-wa-Khasis. After the palace is constructed, Ba'al gives forth a thunderous roar out of the palace window and challenges Mot. Mot enters through the window and swallows Ba'al, sending him to the underworld. With no one to give rain, there is a terrible drought in Ba'al's absence. The other deities, especially El and Anat, are distraught that Ba'al had been taken to the underworld. Anat goes to the underworld, attacks Mot with a knife, grinds him up into pieces, and scatters him far and wide. With Mot defeated, Ba'al is able to return and refresh the Earth with rain.

=== List of deities ===
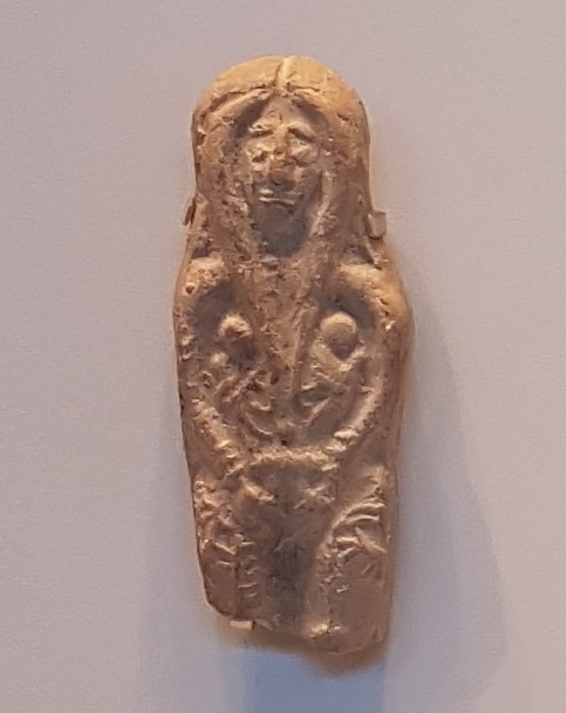
Revadim Asherah figurine (c. 1400–1200 BCE), discovered in southern Israel

A group of deities in a four-tier hierarchy headed by El and Asherah (Note: "Handy (1994:176,177) describes the four hierarchical levels in Syro-Palestinian mythology. The first level consists of the deity El (or his equivalents) and Asherah. The second level consists of the active deities or patron gods, for example Baal, and the third, the artisan gods, for example Kothar-wa-Khasis. The lowest level consists of the messenger gods, who have no independent volition, which Handy equates with the "angels" of the Bible.") (Note: Per the Syro-Palestinian perception of the cosmos, the fourfold hierarchy of the divine realm may be diagrammed as follows: Authoritative Deities: El; Active Deities: Baal; Artisan Deities: Kothar; Messenger Deities: gpn w ugr) were worshipped by the followers of the Canaanite religion; this is a detailed listing:

- Anat, virgin goddess of war and strife, sister and putative mate of Baʿal Hadad.
- Arsay, goddess of the underworld, one of the three daughters of Ba'al Hadad.
- Asherah, queen consort of El (Ugaritic religion), Amurru (Amorite religion), Elkunirša (Hittite religion) and 'Amm (Religion in pre-Islamic Arabia). While it is sometimes claimed that Asherah was considered Yahweh's consort in Israelite religion, Edward Lipiński argues that the Hebrew ʾašērāh mentioned in epigraphic sources refers to a "holy place" rather than a goddess.
- Ashima, goddess of fate.
- Astarte, goddess of war, hunting and love.
- Attar, god of the morning star ("son of the morning") who tried to take the place of the dead Baal and failed. Male counterpart of Athtart.
- Ba'alah, the wife or female counterpart of Ba'al (also Belili).
- Ba'alat Gebal, goddess of Byblos, Phoenicia.
- Ba'al Zephon or Baʿal Ṣaphon, lord of the north. Alternate form of Ba'al Hadad as lord of Mount Zaphon.
- Bethel, who became popular during the Neo-Babylonian Empire in the Syria region and in the Samarian-Judean diaspora settlement of Elephantine, Egypt.
- Dagon (Dagan) god of crop fertility and grain, father of Ba'al Hadad.
- El, also called 'Il or Elyon ("Most High"), god of creation, husband of Athirat. (Note: [Deuteronomy 32:8–9] suggests that Yahweh, originally a warrior-god from Sinai / Paran / Edom / Teiman, was known separately from El at an early point in early Israel.) (Note: Whereas the Israelites originated as Bronze Age Canaanites, the origin of Yahweh is indeterminate (see Yahweh §Bronze Age origins). Following the introduction of Yahweh (localized to the Iron Age kingdoms of Israel (Samaria) and Judah), a shift in theophoric naming occurred in which the original and most ancient biblical names paying tribute to El (Israel, Daniel, Samuel, Michael etc.) began to be displaced by names paying tribute to Yahweh. Mark S. Smith sees the conflation of El and Yahweh as part of the process which he describes as "convergence" in the period of the Judges and the early monarchy. Convergence saw the coalescence of the qualities of other deities, and even the deities themselves, into Yahweh. Thus El became identified as a name of Yahweh, while Asherah ceased to be a distinct goddess. And the attributes of El, Asherah, and Baal (notably, for Baal, his identification as a storm-god) were assimilated into Yahweh. Some of the idiosyncratic aspects of Yahweh are described by Smith as "differentiation" in the period from the 9th century BCE through to the Exile. Differentiation identified and rejected certain Canaanite features i.e. Baal, child sacrifice, the asherah, worship of the sun and moon, and the cults of the "high places".)
- Gad, god of fortune.
- Gupan and Ugar, messenger gods of the weather god Baal, who always appear as a pair.
- Hadad, often known as Baʿal "Lord", god of storms, thunder, lightning and air. King of the gods. Uses the weapons Driver and Chaser in battle. Often referred to as Baalshamin.
- Haurun, an underworld god, co-ruler of the underworld, twin brother of Melqart, a son of Mot. Bethoron of ancient Israel, takes its name from Horon.
- Išḫara, a goddess of Eblaite origin.
- Ishat, goddess of fire, who was slain by Anat.
- Kotharat, seven goddesses of marriage and pregnancy.
- Kothar-wa-Khasis, the skilled god of craftsmanship, created Yagrush and Aymur (Driver and Chaser) the weapons used by the god Ba'al Hadad.
- Lotan, the twisting, seven-headed serpent ally of Yam.
- Marqod, god of dance.
- Mot or Maweth, god of death (not worshiped or given offerings).
- Nikkal-wa-Ib, goddess of orchards and fruit.
- Pidray, goddess of light and lightning, one of the three daughters of Ba'al Hadad.
- Qadeshtu, lit. "Holy One", putative goddess of love, desire and lust. Also a title of Asherah.
- Resheph, god of plague and of healing.
- Shachar and Shalim, twin mountain gods of dawn and dusk, respectively. Shalim was linked to the netherworld via the evening star and associated with peace.
- Shapash, also transliterated Shapshu, goddess of the sun; sometimes equated with the Mesopotamian sun god Shamash, whose gender is disputed. Some authorities consider Shamash a goddess.
- Tallai, the goddess of rain and dew, one of the three daughters of Ba'al Hadad.
- Yam (lit. 'sea-river') the god of the sea and rivers, also called Judge Nahar (judge of the river).
- Yarikh, god of the moon and husband of Nikkal. The city of Jericho was likely his cultic center.

==== Iron Age regional and national patron deities ====
In the Iron Age, the decline of Egyptian hegemony over Canaan coincided with the coalescence of local political and communal identities, alongside the rise of distinct regional and national cults tied to specific cities and peoples, often centered around a patron god.

- Ba'al Hermon, titular local deity of Mount Hermon.
- Chemosh, possibly one of the sons of El, a god of war and destruction and the national god of the Moabites and the Ammonites.
- Eshmun, god of healing and the tutelary god of Sidon.
- Melqart, "king of the city", god of Tyre, the underworld and cycle of vegetation in Tyre, co-ruler of the underworld, twin brother of Horon and son of Mot.
- Milcom, national god of the Ammonites.
- Misor, twin brother of Sydyk. In Phoenician mythic genealogy, his son Taautus was believed to be the inventor of writing.
- Sydyk, the god of righteousness or justice, sometimes twinned with Misor, and linked to the planet Jupiter.
- Qos, national god of the Edomites.
- Yahweh (YHWH), national god of the Israelites and central figure of worship in Yahwism.

== Practices ==
=== Religious practices ===
Archaeological investigations at the site of Tell es-Safi have found the remains of donkeys, as well as some sheep and goats in Early Bronze Age layers, dating to 4,900 years ago which were imported from Egypt in order to be sacrificed. One of the sacrificial animals, a complete donkey, was found beneath the foundations of a building, leading to speculation this was a 'foundation deposit' placed before the building of a residential house.

It is considered virtually impossible to reconstruct a clear picture of Canaanite religious practices, but child sacrifice by the Canaanites was known to surrounding peoples. According to K.L. Noll, under the duress of military crisis, human sacrifice was offered to the divine patron of a besieged city, as well as the sacrifice of prisoners of war to the victorious god. Ronald Hendel believes the Israelites disparaged the Canaanite religion because they wanted to disassociate themselves from their Canaanite ancestors and form a new national identity.

Canaanite religious practice had a high regard for the duty of children to care for their parents, with sons being held responsible for burying them, and arranging for the maintenance of their tombs.

Canaanite deities such as Baal were represented by figures which were placed in shrines, often on hilltops, or 'high places' surrounded by groves of trees, such as is condemned in the Hebrew Bible, in Hosea (v 13a) which would probably hold the Asherah pole, and standing stones or pillars.

=== Funerary rites ===
Funerary rites held an important role in Canaanite religion and included rituals to honor the deceased and to feed the "npš" (the origin of the Hebrew word ״נפש״ and usually translated as soul) as it moved on to Mot, the land of death. Rituals to honor the deceased included offerings of incense, libations, music, the singing of devotional songs, and sometimes trance rituals, oracles, and necromancy.

Excavations in Tel Megiddo have offered greater insight into Canaanite funerary practices. A large number of wine vessels have been found in the graves there, as well as vessels of beeswax, animal fat, olive oil, resin, and even vanilla. These grave goods may have been used as part of a funerary feast, as offerings to the dead, or both. Additionally, evidence of opium use was found at "a Late Bronze Age site in the southern Levant". The presence of grave goods may suggest similarities between Canaanite practices and the Ancient Egyptian custom of providing the deceased with supplies for the afterlife.

== Contact with other areas ==
Canaanite religion was strongly influenced by their more powerful and populous neighbors, and shows clear influence of Mesopotamian and Egyptian religious practices. Like other people of the Ancient Near East Canaanite religious beliefs were polytheistic, with families typically focusing on veneration of the dead in the form of household gods and goddesses, the Elohim, while acknowledging the existence of other deities such as Baal and El, Mot, Qos, Asherah and Astarte. Kings also played an important religious role and in certain ceremonies, such as the hieros gamos of the New Year, may have been revered as gods. "At the center of Canaanite religion was royal concern for religious and political legitimacy and the imposition of a divinely ordained legal structure, as well as peasant emphasis on fertility of the crops, flocks, and humans."

Robert G. Boling said that there was no "local pantheon" in Canaan. Instead, the Canaanites selectively worshipped the "most important and interesting deities" from their neighbors, gave them multiple names and omitted their geographic origins. Like language, their gods also varied over time. Boling finds this unsurprising because Canaan was a land bridge between Asia and Africa, where cross-cultural exchange was frequent.

Canaanite religion was influenced by its peripheral position, intermediary between Egypt and Mesopotamia, whose religions had a growing impact upon Canaanite religion. For example, during the Hyksos period, when chariot-mounted maryannu ruled in Egypt, at their capital city of Avaris, Baal became associated with the Egyptian god Set, (Sutekh or Seth) and was considered identical. Iconographically henceforth, Baal was shown wearing the crown of Lower Egypt and shown in the Egyptian-like stance, one foot set before the other. Similarly Athirat (known by her later Hebrew name Asherah), Athtart (known by her later Greek name Astarte), and Anat henceforth were portrayed wearing Hathor-like Egyptian wigs.

From the other direction, Jean Bottéro and Giovanni Pettinato have said that Ya of Ebla and the more familiar Yah (or Yahweh) were related to the Mesopotamian god Ea during the Akkadian Empire. In the Middle and Late Bronze Age, there are also strong Hurrian and Mitannite influences upon the Canaanite religion. The Hurrian goddess Hebat was worshiped in Jerusalem, and Baal was closely considered equivalent to the Hurrian storm god Teshub and the Hittite storm god, Tarhunt. Canaanite divinities seem to have been almost identical in form and function to the neighboring Arameans to the east, and Baal Hadad and El can be distinguished amongst earlier Amorites, who at the end of the Early Bronze Age invaded Mesopotamia.

Carried west by Phoenician sailors, Canaanite religious influences can be seen in Greek mythology, particularly in the tripartite division between the Olympians Zeus, Poseidon and Hades, mirroring the division between Baal, Yam and Mot, and in the story of the Labours of Hercules, mirroring the stories of the Tyrian Melqart, who was often equated with Heracles.

== See also ==
- Canaanite languages
- Origins of Judaism
- Palmyrene Religion

== Sources ==
- Moscatti, Sabatino (1968). The World of the Phoenicians. Phoenix / Giant.
- Ribichini, Sergio (1997). "Beliefs and religious life". In Sabatino, Maoscati (ed.). The Phoenicians. Rissoli.
- van der Toorn, Karel (1995). Dictionary of Deities and Demons in the Bible. New York, NY: E.J. Brill. ISBN 0-8028-2491-9.
- Haanat, Lilinah (ed.). "Bibliography of Canaanite & Phoenician Studies". Archived from the original on 4 March 2016.
- Dawson, Tess (2009). Whisper of Stone. Natib Qadish: Modern Canaanite Religion. O Books. ISBN 978-1-84694-190-0.
- Wright, David P. (2013). "Syro-Canaanite Religions". In Salzman, Michele Renee (ed.). The Cambridge History of Religions in the Ancient World. Cambridge University Press. pp. 129–150. ISBN 9781139600507.
- Noll, Kurt Lesher (2007). "Canaanite Religion". Religion Compass. 1 (1): 61–92. doi:10.1111/j.1749-8171.2006.00010.x – via Academia.edu.
