= Cronus =

Ruler of the Titans in Greek mythology

- Leader of the Titans
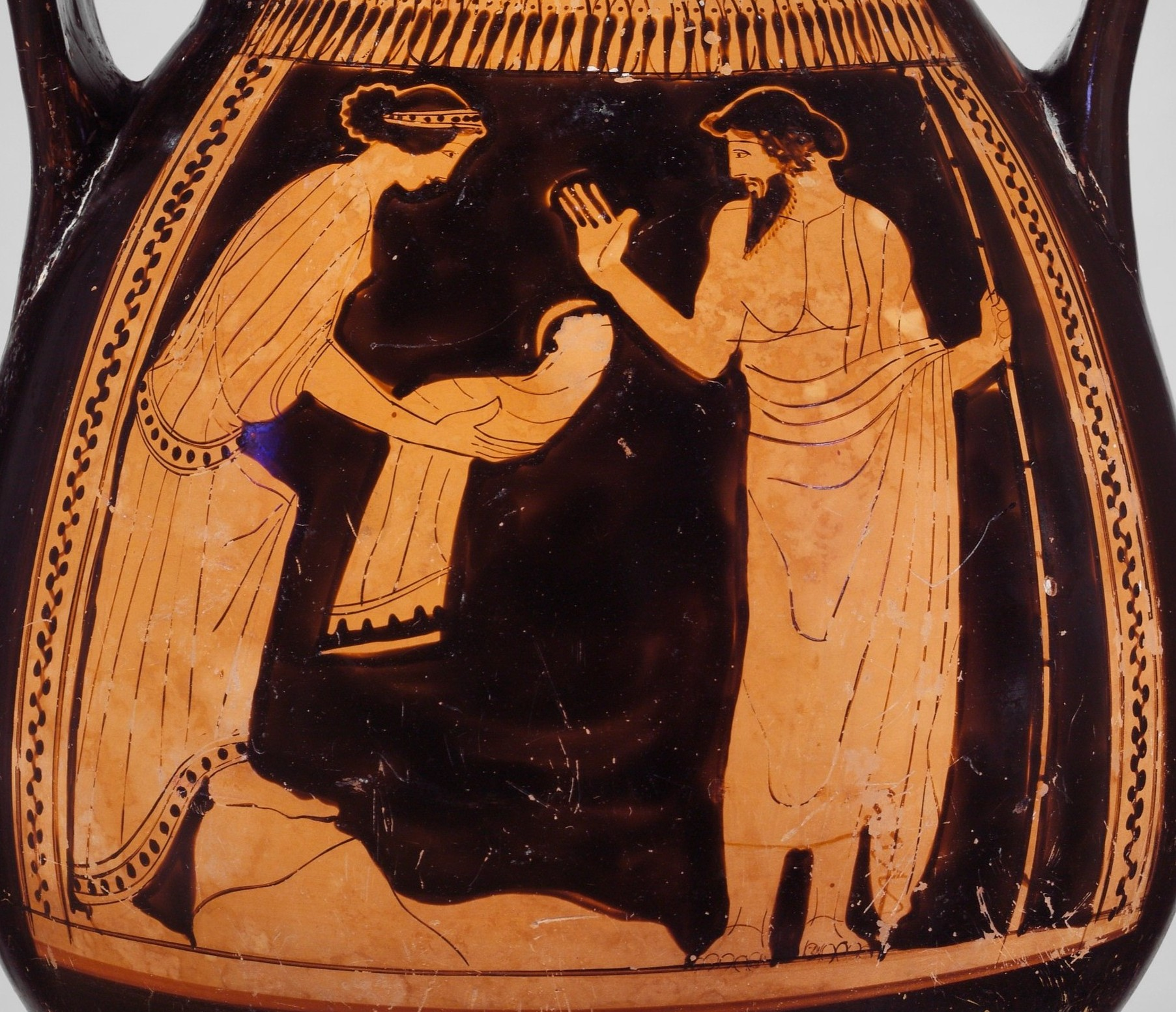
- Rhea offers to Cronus a stone wrapped in swaddling clothes, in place of the newborn Zeus. Red-figure ceramic vase, c. 460–450 BC, Metropolitan Museum of Art.
- Ancient Greek: Κρόνος
- Predecessor: Uranus
- Successor: Zeus
- Abode: Mount Othrys (formerly); Tartarus
- Planet: Saturn
- Battles: Titanomachy
- Symbol: Grain, sickle, scythe

Genealogy
- Parents: Uranus and Gaia
- Consort: Rhea
- Children: Hestia, Hades, Demeter, Poseidon, Hera, Zeus, Chiron

Equivalents
- Roman: Saturn
- Egyptian: Geb

In ancient Greek religion and mythology, Cronus, Cronos, or Kronos (/ˈkroʊnəs/ or /ˈkroʊnɒs/; Ancient Greek: Κρόνος) was the leader and youngest of the Titans, the children of Gaia (Earth) and Uranus (Sky). Cronus castrated and overthrew his father and then ruled during the mythological Golden Age until he himself was overthrown by his son, Zeus, and imprisoned in Tartarus. An alternate genealogy is presented by Plato, who wrote that Cronus, Phorcys, and Rhea were the children of Oceanus and Tethys.

Cronus was usually depicted with a harpe, scythe, or sickle, which was the instrument he used to castrate and depose Uranus, his father. Cronus was likely originally a harvest god, which is why in many regions of Greece the month of the harvest was named Cronion after him. In Athens, on the twelfth day of the Attic month of Hekatombaion, a festival called Kronia was held in honour of Cronus to celebrate the harvest, suggesting that, as a result of his association with the virtuous Golden Age, Cronus continued to preside as a patron of the harvest. Cronus was also identified in classical antiquity with the Roman deity Saturn.

== Mythology ==
=== Rise to power ===
In an ancient myth recorded by Hesiod's Theogony, Cronus envied the power of his father, Uranus, the ruler of the universe. Uranus drew the enmity of Cronus's mother, Gaia, when he hid the gigantic youngest children of Gaia, the hundred-handed Hecatoncheires and one-eyed Cyclopes, in Tartarus, so that they would not see the light. Gaia created a great stone sickle and gathered together Cronus and his brothers to persuade them to castrate Uranus.

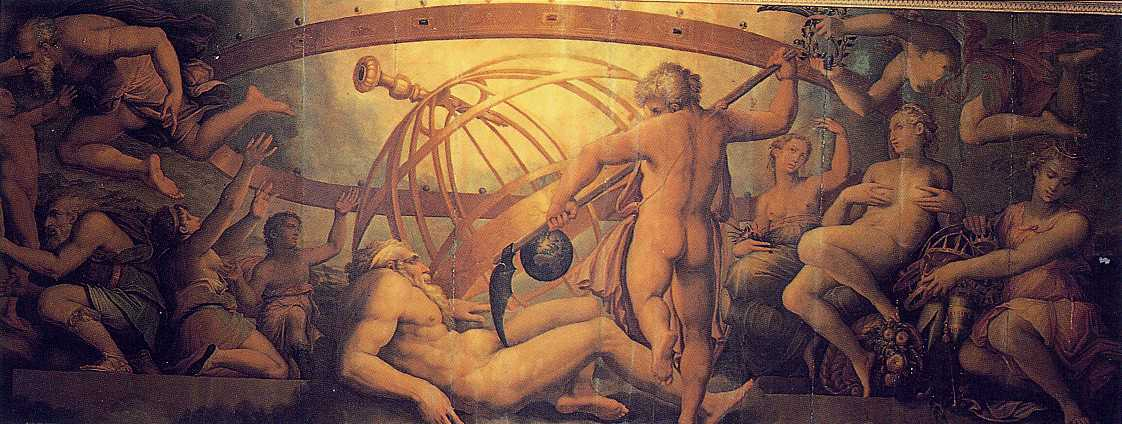
The Mutilation of Uranus by Saturn [Cronus], 16th-century oil painting by Giorgio Vasari

Only Cronus was willing to do the deed, so Gaia gave him the sickle and placed him in ambush. When Uranus met with Gaia, Cronus attacked him with the sickle, castrating him and casting his testicles into the sea. From the blood that spilled out from Uranus and fell upon the earth, the Gigantes, Erinyes, and Meliae were produced. The testicles produced a white foam from which the goddess Aphrodite emerged. For this, Uranus threatened vengeance and called his sons Titenes (Note: Τιτῆνες; according to Hesiod meaning "straining ones," the source of the word "titan", but this etymology is disputed.) for overstepping their boundaries and daring to commit such an act. After the deed was done, Cronus cast his sickle into the waves, and it was concealed under the island of Corfu, which had been noted since antiquity for its sickle-like shape, and gave it its ancient name, Drepane ("sickle").

While Hesiod seems to imply Cronus never set them free to begin with, Pseudo-Apollodorus says that after dispatching Uranus, Cronus re-imprisoned the Hecatoncheires and the Cyclopes and set the dragon Campe to guard them. He and his older sister Rhea took the throne of the world as king and queen. The period in which Cronus ruled was called the Golden Age, as the people of the time had no need for laws or rules; everyone did the right thing, and immorality was absent. In some authors, a different divine pair, Ophion and Eurynome, a daughter of Oceanus, were said to have ruled Mount Olympus in the early age of the Titans. Rhea fought Eurynome and Cronus fought Ophion, and after defeating them they threw them into the waves of the ocean, thus becoming rulers in their place.

=== King of the gods ===
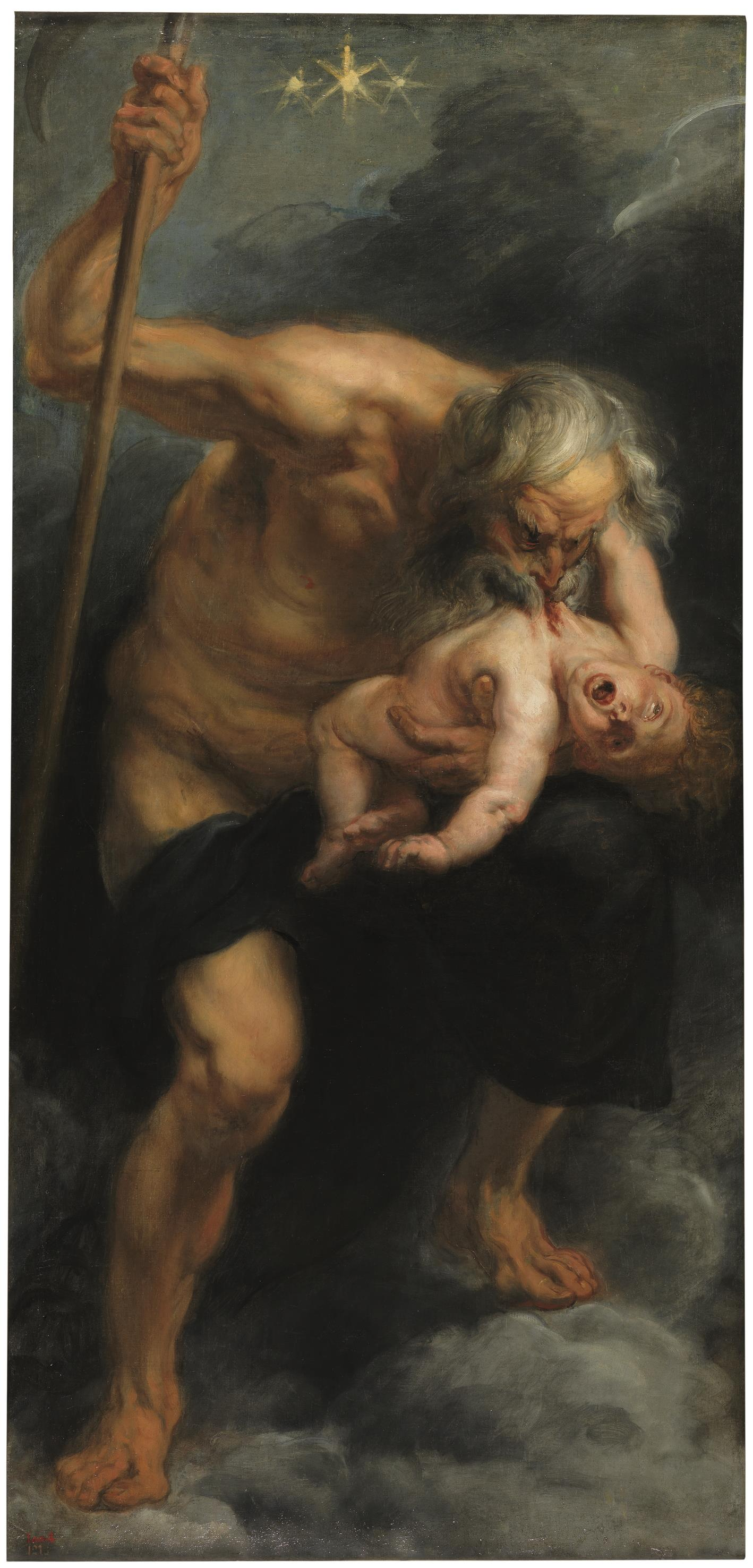
Cronus devouring one of his sons, 17th-century oil painting by Peter Paul Rubens

After securing his place as the new king of the gods, Cronus learned from Gaia and Uranus that he was destined to be overcome by his own children, just as he had overthrown his father. As a result, although he sired the gods Demeter, Hestia, Hera, Hades, and Poseidon by Rhea, he devoured them all as soon as they were born to prevent the prophecy. When the sixth child, Zeus, was born, Rhea sought Gaia to devise a plan to save them and to eventually get retribution on Cronus for his acts against his father and children.

Rhea secretly gave birth to Zeus in Crete, and handed Cronus a stone wrapped in swaddling clothes, also known as the Omphalos Stone, which he promptly swallowed, thinking that it was his son. According to De astronomia, when Rhea presented the swaddled rock to him, Cronus asked her to nurse the infant one last time before he swallowed him. Rhea pressed her breast against the rock, and the milk that was sprayed across the heavens created the Milky Way galaxy. Cronus then ate the rock.

Rhea kept Zeus hidden in a cave on Mount Ida, Crete. According to some versions of the story, he was then raised by a goat named Amalthea, while a company of Curetes, armored male dancers, shouted and clanged their shields and spears to make enough noise to mask the baby's cries from Cronus. In the Fabulae, Amalthea was a nymph who hid Zeus by placing him in a cradle in a tree, so that he was suspended between the earth, the sea, and the sky, all of which were ruled by his father, Cronus. Still other versions of the tale say that Zeus was raised by his grandmother, Gaia. One Cretan myth relates how Cronus once went to Crete himself, and Zeus, in order to hide from his father, transformed himself into a snake, and changed his nymph nurses, Helice and Cynosura, into bears, who later became the constellations Ursa Major and Ursa Minor. In another myth, Cronus transformed the Curetes into lions, but Rhea made them her sacred animals and yoked them in her chariot.

=== Overthrown ===
According to Hesiod, once Zeus had grown up, Cronus was forced to regurgitate his children through Gaia's cunning and Zeus's might. Cronus disgorged first the stone that he had swallowed instead of Zeus, followed by Zeus's siblings. The stone was then placed by Zeus at Pytho on Mount Parnassus.

In other versions of the tale, Metis gave Cronus an emetic to force him to disgorge the children.

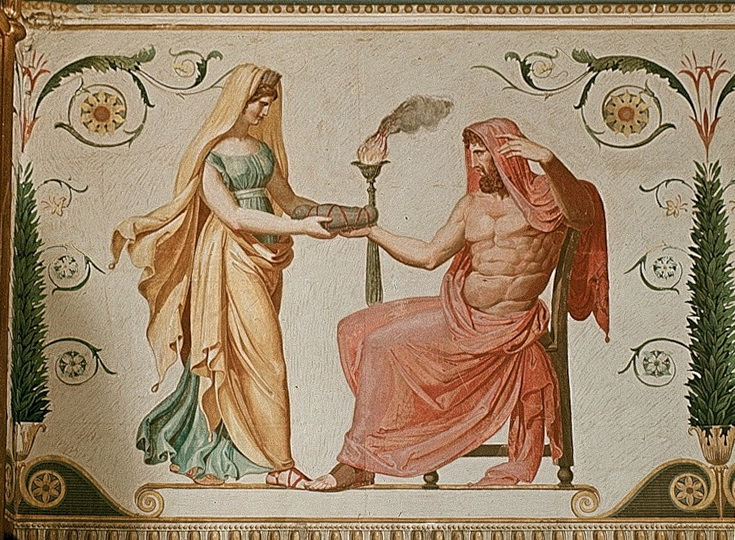
Rhea giving the rock to Cronus, 19th-century painted frieze by Karl Friedrich Schinkel

After freeing his siblings, Zeus released the Hecatoncheires and the Cyclopes who gifted him his thunderbolts. In a vast war called the Titanomachy, Zeus and his older brothers and sisters, with the help of the Hecatoncheires and Cyclopes, overthrew Cronus and the other Titans. Afterwards, many of the Titans were confined in Tartarus. However, Oceanus, Helios, Atlas, Prometheus, Epimetheus, and Astraeus were not imprisoned following the Titanomachy. Gaia bore the monster Typhon to claim revenge for the imprisoned Titans.

Accounts of the fate of Cronus after the Titanomachy differ. The most popular account is that found in the Iliad, Hesiod's Theogony, and Apollodorus, all of which state that he was imprisoned with the other Titans in Tartarus. In two papyrus versions of a passage from Hesiod's Works and Days, however, Kronos rules over the Isle of the Blessed, having been released from Tartarus by Zeus. This version of Cronus's fate is also found in Pindar. In a fragment of an Orphic cosmogony, Zeus intoxicates Cronus with honey, sending him to sleep, and then castrates him.

=== Libyan account by Diodorus Siculus ===
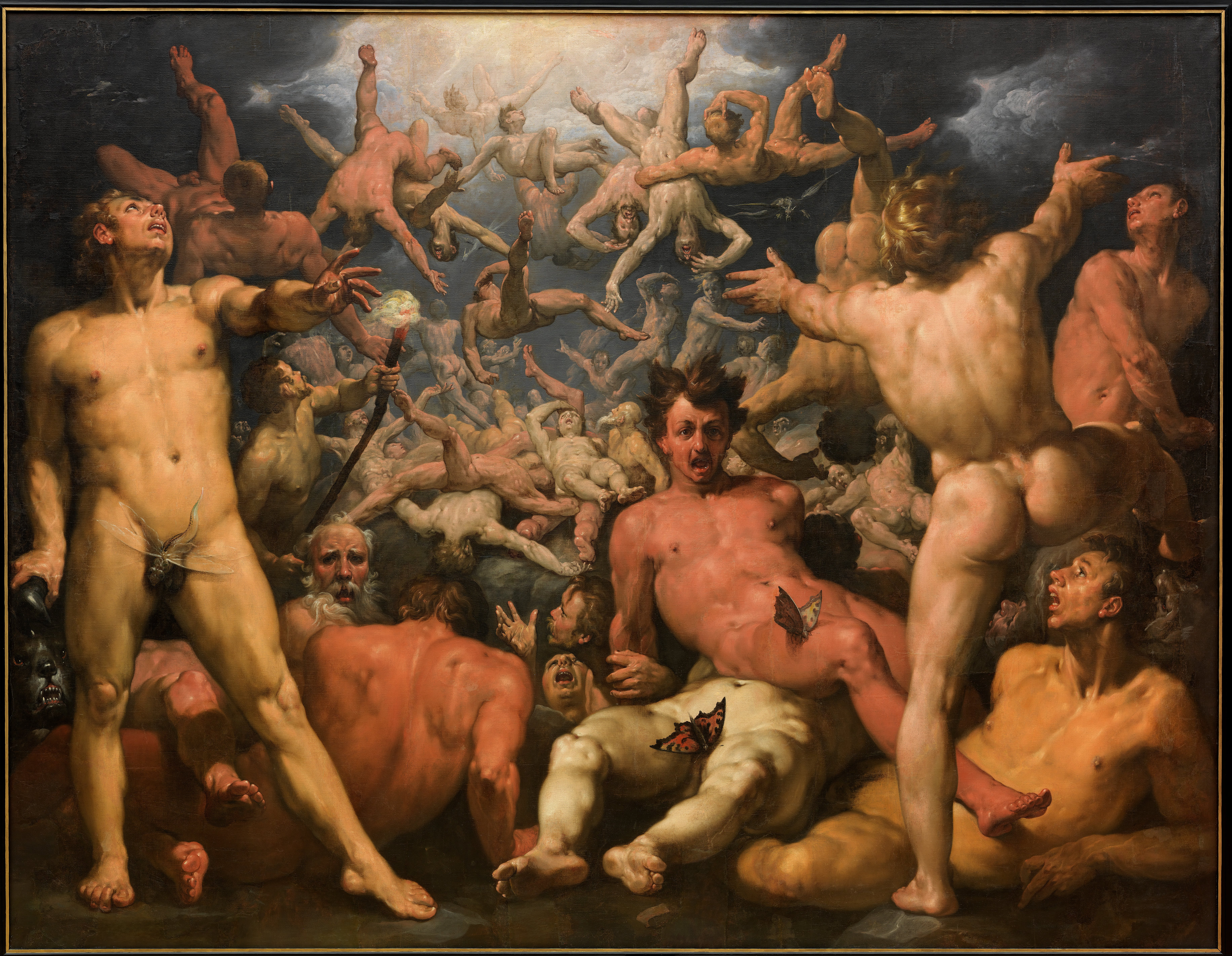
The Fall of the Titans, oil painting by Cornelis Cornelisz van Haarlem, 1588–1590

In a Libyan account related by Diodorus Siculus (Book 3), Uranus and Titaea were the parents of Cronus and Rhea and the other Titans. Ammon, a king of Libya, married Rhea (3.18.1). However, Rhea abandoned Ammon and married her younger brother Cronus. With Rhea's incitement, Cronus and the other Titans made war upon Ammon, who fled to Crete (3.71.1–2). Cronus ruled harshly and Cronus in turn was defeated by Ammon's son Dionysus (3.71.3–3.73) who appointed Cronus's and Rhea's son, Zeus, as king of Egypt (3.73.4). Dionysus and Zeus then joined their forces to defeat the remaining Titans in Crete, and on the death of Dionysus, Zeus inherited all the kingdoms, becoming lord of the world (3.73.7–8).

=== Sibylline Oracles ===
Cronus is mentioned in the Sibylline Oracles, particularly in book three, wherein Cronus, 'Titan,' and Iapetus, the three sons of Uranus and Gaia, each receive a third of the Earth, and Cronus is made king overall. After the death of Uranus, Titan's sons attempt to destroy Cronus's and Rhea's male offspring as soon as they are born. However, at Dodona, Rhea secretly bears her sons Zeus, Poseidon, and Hades and sends them to Phrygia to be raised in the care of three Cretans. Upon learning this, sixty of Titan's men then imprison Cronus and Rhea, causing the sons of Cronus to declare and fight the first of all wars against them. This account mentions nothing about Cronus either killing his father or attempting to kill any of his children.

=== Release from Tartarus ===
In Hesiod's Theogony, and Homer's Iliad, Cronus and his Titan brothers are confined to Tartarus, apparently forever, but in other traditions Cronus and the other imprisoned Titans are eventually set free by the mercy of Zeus. Two papyrus versions of a passage of Hesiod's Works and Days mention Cronus being released by Zeus, and ruling over the heroes who go to the Isle of the Blessed; but other editions of Hesiod's text make no mention of this, and most editors agree that these lines of text are later interpolations in Hesiod's works.

And they live untouched by sorrow in the islands of the blessed along the shore of deep swirling Ocean, happy heroes for whom the grain-giving earth bears honey-sweet fruit flourishing thrice a year, far from the deathless gods, and Cronos rules over them; for the father of men and gods released him from his bonds.

The poet Pindar, in one of his poems (462 BC), wrote that although Atlas still "strains against the weight of the sky ... Zeus freed the Titans", and in another poem (476 BC), Pindar has Cronus released from Tartarus and now ruling in the Isles of the Blessed, a mythical land where the Greek heroes reside in the afterlife:

Those who have persevered three times, on either side, to keep their souls free from all wrongdoing, follow Zeus's road to the end, to the tower of Cronus, where ocean breezes blow around the island of the blessed, and flowers of gold are blazing, some from splendid trees on land, while water nurtures others. With these wreaths and garlands of flowers they entwine their hands according to the righteous counsels of Rhadamanthys, whom the great father, the husband of Rhea whose throne is above all others, keeps close beside him as his partner.

Prometheus Lyomenos (Prometheus Unbound), an undated lost play by the playwright Aeschylus (c. 525 – c. 455 BC), features a chorus composed of freed Titans as witnesses of Prometheus's freeing from the rock, perhaps including Cronus himself, although the now freed Titans are not individually identified.

=== Other accounts ===
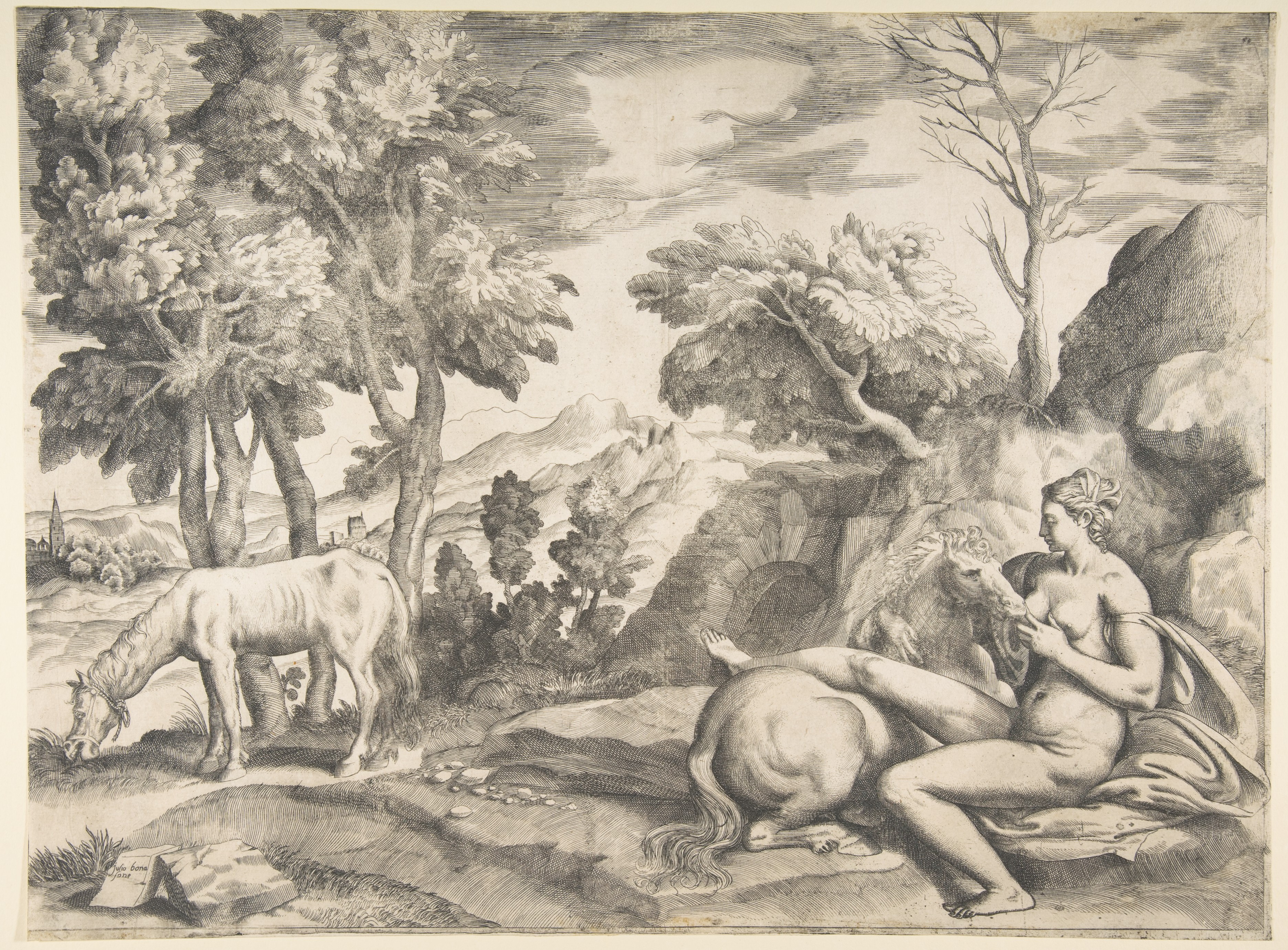
Saturn in the guise of a horse being suckled by the nymph Philyra, engraving by Giulio Bonasone, circa 1513–1576, Metropolitan Museum of Art

In one version of Typhon's origins, after the defeat of the Giants, Gaia in anger slandered Zeus to Hera, and she went to Cronus. Cronus gave his daughter two eggs smeared with his own semen and told her to bury them underground, so that they would produce a creature capable of dethroning Zeus. Hera did so, and thus Typhon came to be.

Cronus was said to be the father of the wise centaur Chiron by the Oceanid Philyra, who was subsequently transformed into a linden tree. The god lay with the nymph, but his wife Rhea discovered them fornicating; in order to escape, Cronus transformed into a stallion and galloped away, hence the half-human, half-equine shape of their offspring. This episode was said to have taken place on Mount Pelion.

Two other sons of Cronus and Philyra may have been Dolops and Aphrus, the ancestor and eponym of the Aphroi, i.e. the native Africans. In some accounts, Cronus was also called the father of the Corybantes.

Cronus is featured in one of the works of satirical writer Lucian of Samosata, Saturnalia, where he talks with one of his priests about his festival Saturnalia, (Note: Notably, Lucian does not call Saturnalia by that name.) with a central theme being the mistreatment of the poor by the rich during festival-time. In the dialogue, Cronus rejects the Hesiodic tradition of him eating his children and then being overthrown, and instead claims that he peacefully abdicated the throne in favour of his youngest son Zeus, although he still resumes rulership for seven days each year (his festival) in order to remind humanity of the plenteous, toil-free and luxuriant life they enjoyed under his reign before the Olympians took over.

== Name and comparative mythology ==
=== Antiquity ===
During antiquity, Cronus was occasionally interpreted as Chronos, the personification of time. The Roman philosopher Cicero (1st century BC) elaborated on this by saying that the Greek name Cronus is synonymous to chrónos (time) since he maintains the course and cycles of seasons and the periods of time, whereas the Latin name Saturn denotes that he is saturated with years since he was devouring his sons, which implies that time devours the ages and gorges.

The Greek historian and biographer Plutarch (1st century AD) asserted that the Greeks believed that Cronus was an allegorical name for χρόνος (time). The philosopher Plato (4th century BC) in his Cratylus gives two possible interpretations for the name of Cronus. The first is that his name denotes κόρος (kóros), "the pure" (καθαρόν) and "unblemished" (ἀκήρατον) nature of his mind. The second is that Rhea and Cronus were given names of streams: Rhea from ῥοή (rhoē) "river, stream, flux" and Cronus from χρόνος (chronos) "time". Proclus (5th century), the Neoplatonist philosopher, makes in his Commentary on Plato's Cratylus an extensive analysis of Cronus; among others he says that the "One cause" of all things is "Chronos" (time) that is also equivalent to Cronus.

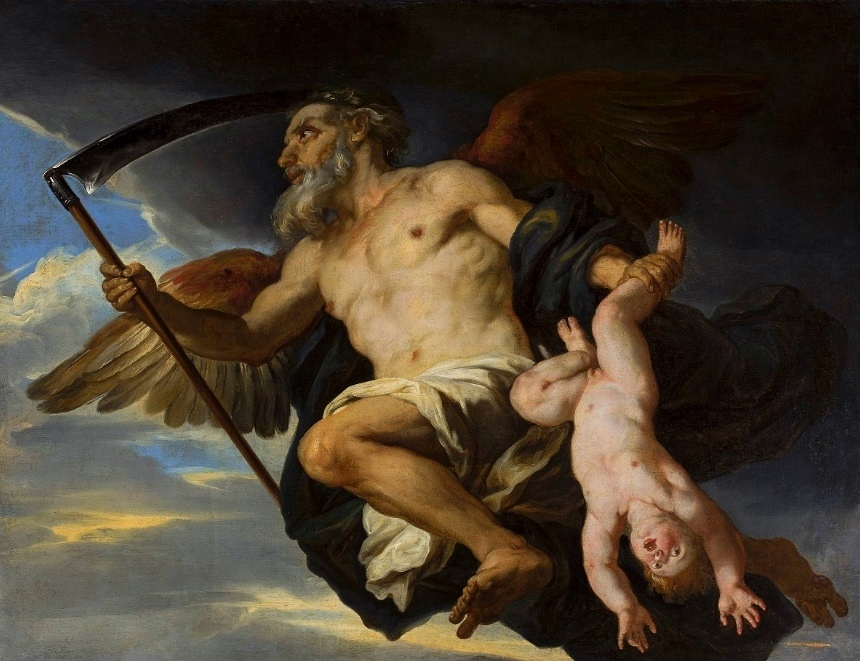
Chronos and his child by Giovanni Francesco Romanelli, National Museum in Warsaw, a 17th-century depiction of Titan Cronus as "Father Time," wielding a harvesting scythe

In addition to the name, the story of Cronus eating his children was also interpreted as an allegory to a specific aspect of time held within Cronus's sphere of influence. As the theory went, Cronus represented the destructive ravages of time which devoured all things, a concept that was illustrated when the Titan king ate the Olympian gods—the past consuming the future, the older generation suppressing the next generation.

The Gnostic text Pistis Sophia (3rd–4th century) references the name Cronus, portraying the deity as a great ruler over others within the aeons.

=== From the Renaissance to the present ===
During the Renaissance, the identification of Cronus and Chronos gave rise to "Father Time" wielding the harvesting scythe.

H. J. Rose in 1928 observed that attempts to give the name Κρόνος a Greek etymology had failed. Recently, Janda (2010) offers a genuinely Indo-European etymology of "the cutter", from the root *(s)ker- "to cut" (Greek κείρω (keirō), cf. English shear), motivated by Cronus's characteristic act of "cutting the sky" (or the genitals of anthropomorphic Uranus). The Indo-Iranian reflex of the root is *kar-, but Janda argues that the original meaning "to cut" in a cosmogonic sense is still preserved in some verses of the Rigveda pertaining to Indra's heroic "cutting", like that of Cronus resulting in creation:

RV 10.104.10 ārdayad vṛtram akṛṇod ulokaṃ
he hit Vrtra fatally, cutting [> creating] a free path.
RV 6.47.4 varṣmāṇaṃ divo akṛṇod
he cut [> created] the loftiness of the sky.

This may point to an older Indo-European mytheme reconstructed as *(s)kert wersmn diwos "by means of a cut he created the loftiness of the sky". The myth of Cronus castrating Uranus parallels the Song of Kumarbi, where Anu (the heavens) is castrated by Kumarbi. In the Song of Ullikummi, Teshub uses the "sickle with which heaven and earth had once been separated" to defeat the monster Ullikummi, establishing that the "castration" of the heavens by means of a sickle was part of a creation myth, in origin a cut creating an opening or gap between heaven (imagined as a dome of stone) and earth enabling the beginning of time (chronos) and human history.

A theory debated in the 19th century, and sometimes still offered somewhat apologetically, holds that Κρόνος is related to "horned", assuming a Semitic derivation from *qrn. Andrew Lang's objection, that Cronus was never represented horned in Hellenic art, was addressed by Robert Brown, arguing that, in Semitic usage, as in the Hebrew Bible, qeren was a signifier of "power". When Greek writers encountered the Semitic deity El, they rendered his name as Cronus.

=== Elus, the Phoenician Cronus ===
When Hellenes encountered Phoenicians and, later, Hebrews, they identified the Semitic El, by interpretatio graeca, with Cronus. The association was recorded c. 100 AD by Philo of Byblos's Phoenician history, as reported in Eusebius's Præparatio Evangelica I.10.16. Philo's account, ascribed by Eusebius to the semi-legendary pre-Trojan War Phoenician historian Sanchuniathon, indicates that Cronus was originally a Canaanite ruler who founded Byblos and was subsequently deified. This version gives his alternate name as Elus or Ilus, and states that in the 32nd year of his reign, he emasculated, slew and deified his father Epigeius or Autochthon "whom they afterwards called Uranus". It further states that after ships were invented, Cronus, visiting the 'inhabitable world', bequeathed Attica to his own daughter Athena, and Egypt to Taautus the son of Misor and inventor of writing.

=== Roman mythology and later culture ===
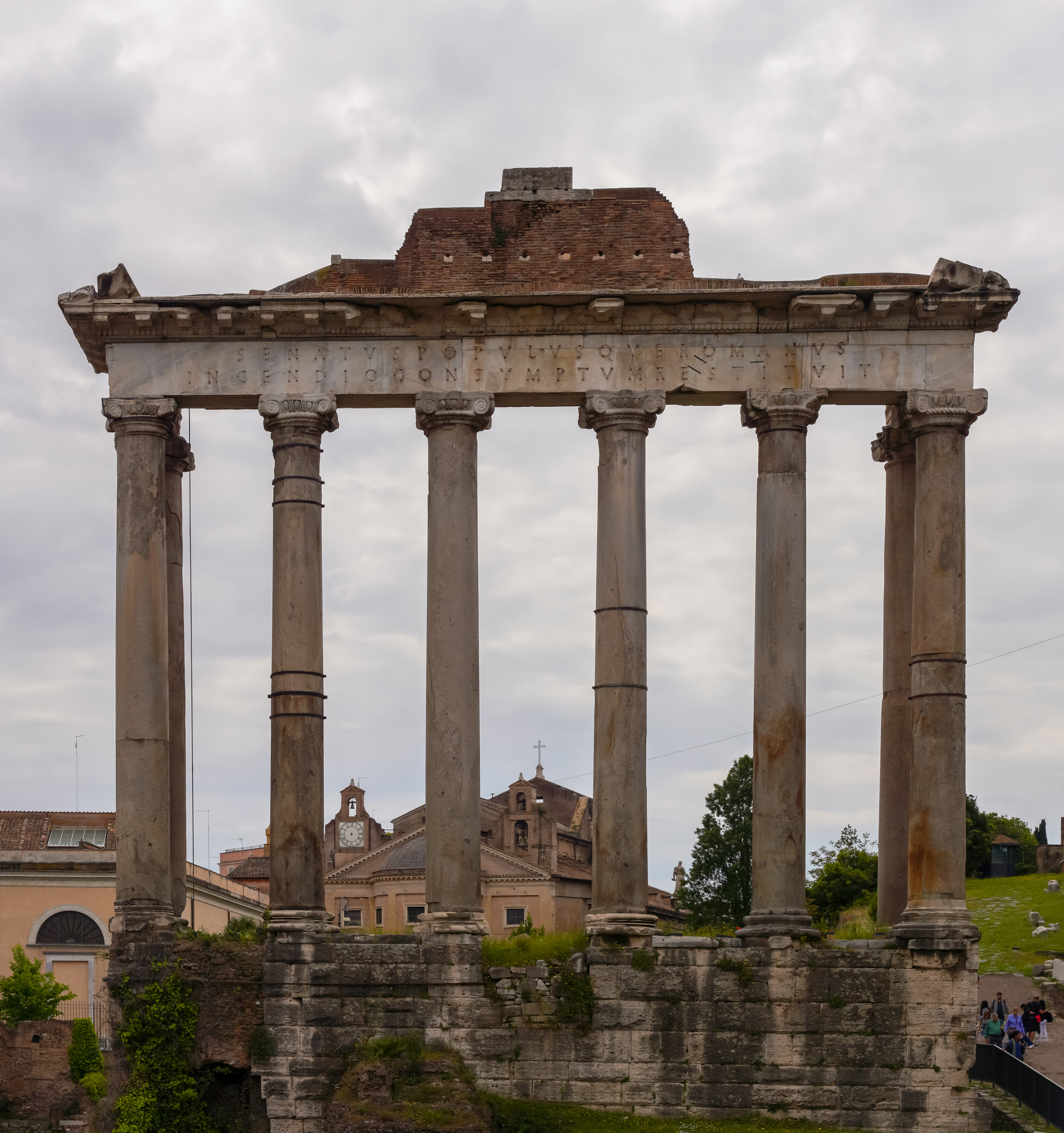
4th-century Temple of Saturn in the Roman Forum

While the Greeks considered Cronus a cruel and tempestuous force of chaos and disorder, believing the Olympian gods had brought an era of peace and order by seizing power from the crude and malicious Titans, the Romans took a more positive and innocuous view of the deity, by conflating their indigenous deity Saturn with Cronus. Consequently, while the Greeks considered Cronus merely an intermediary stage between Uranus and Zeus, he was a larger aspect of Roman religion. The Saturnalia was a festival dedicated in his honour, and at least one temple to Saturn already existed in the archaic Roman Kingdom.

His association with the "Saturnian" Golden Age eventually caused him to become the god of "time", i.e., calendars, seasons, and harvests—not now confused with Chronos, the unrelated embodiment of time in general. Nevertheless, among Hellenistic scholars in Alexandria and during the Renaissance, Cronus was conflated with the name of Chronos, the personification of "Father Time", wielding the harvesting scythe.

As a result of Cronus's importance to the Romans, his Roman variant, Saturn, has had a large influence on Western culture. The seventh day of the Judaeo-Christian week is called in Latin Dies Saturni ("Day of Saturn"), which in turn was adapted and became the source of the English word Saturday. In astronomy, the planet Saturn is named after the Roman deity. It is the outermost of the Classical planets (the astronomical planets that are visible with the naked eye).

=== Cronus alias Geb in Greco-Roman Egypt ===
In Greco-Roman Egypt, Cronus was equated with the Egyptian god Geb, because he held a quite similar position in Egyptian mythology as the father of the gods Osiris, Isis, Seth and Nephthys as Cronus did in the Greek pantheon. This equation is particularly well attested in Tebtunis in the southern Fayyum: Geb and Cronus were here part of a local version of the cult of Sobek, the crocodile god. The equation was shown on the one hand in the local iconography of the gods, in which Geb was depicted as a man with attributes of Cronus and Cronus with attributes of Geb. On the other hand, the priests of the local main temple identified themselves in Egyptian texts as priests of "Soknebtunis-Geb", but in Greek texts as priests of "Soknebtunis-Cronus". Accordingly, Egyptian names formed with the name of the god Geb were just as popular among local villagers as Greek names derived from Cronus, especially the name "Kronion".

== Astronomy ==
A star (HD 240430) was nicknamed after him in 2017 when it was reported to have swallowed its planets. The planet Saturn, named after the Roman equivalent of Cronus, is still referred to as "Cronus" (Κρόνος) in modern Greek.

== Genealogy ==
Descendants of Cronus and Rhea

Gaia
Uranus
Uranus's genitals	Coeus	Phoebe	CRONUS	Rhea
Leto	Zeus	Hera	Poseidon	Hades	Demeter	Hestia
Apollo	Artemis	a
b
Ares	Hephaestus
Metis
Athena
Maia
Hermes
Semele
Dionysus
Dione
a	b
Aphrodite

== General sources ==
- Apollodorus, The Library with an English Translation by Sir James George Frazer, F.B.A., F.R.S. in 2 Volumes, Cambridge, MA, Harvard University Press; London, William Heinemann Ltd. 1921. Online version at the Perseus Digital Library. Greek text available from the same website.
- Apollonius Rhodius, Argonautica translated by Robert Cooper Seaton (1853–1915), R. C. Loeb Classical Library Volume 001. London, William Heinemann Ltd, 1912. Online version at the Topos Text Project.
- Apollonius Rhodius, Argonautica. George W. Mooney. London. Longmans, Green. 1912. Greek text available at the Perseus Digital Library.
- Athanassakis, Apostolos N., and Benjamin M. Wolkow (2013), The Orphic Hymns, Baltimore, Johns Hopkins University Press. ISBN 9781421408828. OCLC 799025024. Internet Archive.
- Callimachus, Hymns translated by Alexander William Mair (1875–1928). London: William Heinemann; New York: G.P. Putnam's Sons. 1921. Online version at the Topos Text Project.
- Callimachus, Works. A. W. Mair. London: William Heinemann; New York: G. P. Putnam's Sons. 1921. Greek text available at the Perseus Digital Library.
- Clark, Matthew, Exploring Greek Myth, John Wiley & Sons, 2012. ISBN 9781405194563. Google Books.
- Fontenrose, Joseph Eddy, Python: A Study of Delphic Myth and Its Origins, University of California Press, 1959. ISBN 978-0-520-04091-5.
- Forbes Irving, Paul M. C. (1990). Metamorphosis in Greek Myths. Clarendon Press. ISBN 0-19-814730-9.
- Gantz, Timothy, Early Greek Myth: A Guide to Literary and Artistic Sources, Johns Hopkins University Press, 1996, Two volumes: ISBN 978-0-8018-5360-9 (Vol. 1), ISBN 978-0-8018-5362-3 (Vol. 2).
- Hesiod, Theogony from The Homeric Hymns and Homerica with an English Translation by Hugh G. Evelyn-White, Cambridge, MA., Harvard University Press; London, William Heinemann Ltd. 1914. Online version at the Perseus Digital Library. Greek text available from the same website.
- Hesiod; Works and Days, in The Homeric Hymns and Homerica with an English Translation by Hugh G. Evelyn-White, Cambridge, Massachusetts, Harvard University Press; London, William Heinemann Ltd. 1914. Online version at the Perseus Digital Library.
- Homer, The Iliad with an English Translation by A. T. Murray, Ph.D. in two volumes. Cambridge, MA., Harvard University Press; London, William Heinemann, Ltd. 1924. Online version at the Perseus Digital Library.
- Homer. Homeri Opera in five volumes. Oxford, Oxford University Press. 1920. Greek text available at the Perseus Digital Library.
- Homer, The Odyssey with an English Translation by A. T. Murray, PH.D. in two volumes. Cambridge, MA., Harvard University Press; London, William Heinemann, Ltd. 1919. Online version at the Perseus Digital Library. Greek text available from the same website.
- Hyginus, Astronomica from The Myths of Hyginus translated and edited by Mary Grant. University of Kansas Publications in Humanistic Studies. Online version at the Topos Text Project.
- Hyginus, Fabulae from The Myths of Hyginus translated and edited by Mary Grant. University of Kansas Publications in Humanistic Studies. Online version at the Topos Text Project.
- Kirk, G. S., J. E. Raven, M. Schofield, The Presocratic Philosophers: A Critical History with a Selection of Texts, Cambridge University Press, Dec 29, 1983. ISBN 978-0-521-27455-5.
- Marcus Tullius Cicero, Nature of the Gods from the Treatises of M. T. Cicero translated by Charles Duke Yonge (1812–1891), Bohn edition of 1878. Online version at the Topos Text Project.
- Marcus Tullius Cicero, De Natura Deorum. O. Plasberg. Leipzig. Teubner. 1917. Latin text available at the Perseus Digital Library.
- Ogden, Daniel (2013a), Drakon: Dragon Myth and Serpent Cult in the Greek and Roman Worlds, Oxford University Press, 2013. ISBN 978-0-19-955732-5.
- Ogden, Daniel (2013b), Dragons, Serpents, and Slayers in the Classical and early Christian Worlds: A sourcebook, Oxford University Press. ISBN 978-0-19-992509-4.
- Oppian, in Oppian, Colluthus, and Tryphiodorus. Translated by A. W. Mair. Loeb Classical Library 219. Cambridge, MA: Harvard University Press, 1928.
- Pindar, Odes, Diane Arnson Svarlien. 1990. Online version at the Perseus Digital Library.
- Plato, Timaeus in Plato in Twelve Volumes, Vol. 9 translated by W.R.M. Lamb. Cambridge, Massachusetts, Harvard University Press; London, William Heinemann Ltd. 1925. Online version at the Perseus Digital Library.
- Pliny the Elder, The Natural History. John Bostock, M.D., F.R.S. H.T. Riley, Esq., B.A. London. Taylor and Francis, Red Lion Court, Fleet Street. 1855. Online version at the Perseus Digital Library.
- Publius Vergilius Maro, Eclogues. J. B. Greenough. Boston. Ginn & Co. 1895. Online version at the Perseus Digital Library.
- Publius Vergilius Maro, Bucolics, Aeneid, and Georgics of Vergil. J. B. Greenough. Boston. Ginn & Co. 1900. Latin text available at the Perseus Digital Library.
- Serbeti, Eleutheria D., "Kronos", in Lexicon Iconographicum Mythologiae Classicae (LIMC). VI.1: Kentauroi et Kentaurides – Oiax, Zürich and Munich, Artemis Verlag, 1992. ISBN 3760887511. Internet Archive.
- Strabo, Geography, Editors, H.C. Hamilton, Esq., W. Falconer, M.A., London. George Bell & Sons. 1903. Online version at the Perseus Digital Library.
