= Ba'al Hermon =

Titular local deity of Mount Hermon

In ancient Canaanite religion, Ba'al Hermon (translated to Lord (Ba'al) of Hermon, meaning consecrated place) was the titular local deity of Mount Hermon. The mountain was inhabited by the Hivites.
