= Baal Marqod =

Phoenician god of dancing

Baal Marqod (in Greek alphabet: ΒΑΛ ΜΑΡΚΟΔ, in Latin alphabet: BALMARCOD, restored in Phoenician: 𐤁𐤏𐤋 𐤌𐤓𐤒𐤃, romanized: bʿl mrqd) was a Phoenician god of dancing. He is attested in Greek and Latin inscriptions from the Maronite monastery in Deir al-Qal'a (near Beit Mery), which was built on a sanctuary dedicated to Baal Marqod, built in the first century CE. Although 19th century scholar had made some different hypotheses of the nature of this god, he is commonly explained as "Baal of dancing" or "lord of dancing" (Baal is both a noun meaning "lord" and a divine name). The name is believed to correspond with his Greek title κοίρανος κωμων (κῶμοι implies games and dances). It is unknown whether he is called so because he was considered the creator of dancing or because dancing was merely the proper way to worship him.

The inscriptions often addressed him as "Iupiter Optimus Maximus Balmarcod" (not Jupiter Optimus Maximus Capitolinus). In one inscription he was called also Μηγριν, meaning threshing floor, as in Hebrew grn), and it may mean that Baal Marqod was also the protector of the crops.

Baal Marqod is mentioned in the modern play Le Martyre de saint Sébastien.
