= Taautus =

Son of Misor and the inventor of writing

Taautus of Byblos (Ancient Greek: Τάαυτος, Táautos), according to the Phoenician writer Sanchuniathon, was the son of Misor and the inventor of writing, who was bequeathed the land of Egypt by Cronus.

Sanchuniathon's writings, through the translation of Philo, were transmitted to us by Eusebius in his work Praeparatio evangelica. Eusebius says that Philo placed Sanchuniathon's works into nine books. In the introduction to the first book, he makes this preface concerning Sanchuniathon:

“These things being so, Sanchuniathon, who was a man of much learning and great curiosity, and desirous of knowing the earliest history of all nations from the creation of the world, searched out with great care the history of Taautus, knowing that of all men under the sun Taautus was the first who thought of the invention of letters, and began the writing of records: and he laid the foundation, as it were, of his history, by beginning with him, whom the Egyptians called Thouth, and the Alexandrians Thoth, translated by the Greeks into Hermes.”

Philo further says that Taautus wrote the work Commentaries, in which he discussed the creation.
