= Sydyk =

Name of the Roman Jupiter god

Sydyk (Συδυκ, in some manuscripts Sydek or Sedek) was the name of a deity appearing in a theogony provided by Roman-era Phoenician writer Philo of Byblos in an account preserved by Eusebius in his Praeparatio evangelica and attributed to the still earlier Sanchuniathon.

== Etymology and role in the Phoenician theogony ==
Philo of Byblos gave the Greek meaning of the name as Δίκαιον "Righteousness", thus indicating that the word corresponds to the Semitic root for "righteousness", √ṣdq. A Phoenician god named ṣdq is well attested epigraphically; he is also mentioned by Philo as half of a pair of deities with Misor (Μισωρ). Sydyk and Misor are described as being born from Amunos and Magos, who were in turn born from the "Wanderers" or Titans. Sydyk is described as the father of the "Dioskouroi or Kabeiroi or Korybants or Samothracians", who are credited with the invention of the ship.

The Phoenician Sydyk was equated with Roman Jupiter, and hence it has been suggested that Sydyk was connected to the worship of the planet Jupiter as the manifestation of justice or righteousness.

Some names, like the rare name ṣdqmlk (Phoenician king of Lapathus and a personal name from Carchemish Phoenician inscription), mlky ṣdq, ṣdqʾ (king of Ashkelon under Sennacherib [he] and a personal name from an inscription from Kition), might be theophories of the god Sydyk. Robert R. Cargill has also argued in favor of etymologizing Melchizedek as "my king is Sedek", suggesting that the deity was worshipped in pre-Israelite Jerusalem.

== Connection to other Middle Eastern deities ==
A connection between Sydyk and the Mesopotamian deity Kittum has been proposed. The latter was also referred to as Ṣidqu and additionally the West Semitic name Ammi-ṣaduqa is translated into Akkadian as Kimtum-kittum showing an equivalence of meaning between the West Semitic צ־ד־ק ṣ-d-q and the Akkadian kittum. Kittu was similarly paired with the god Mīšaru, whose name is a cognate of Misor "Justice". In Mari, the equivalent deities of Išar and Mešar are found.

An Ugaritic reference to a god named Ṣaduq has also been found, a possible forerunner of Sydyk.

It has also been conjectured that a related deity named or titled "Tzedek" (i.e. "righteousness") was worshipped in pre-Israelite Jerusalem as the names of two kings of the city, Melchizedek and Adonizedek contain the element tzedek.

== See also ==
- Misor
- Zadkiel
- Tzadik
