= Hadad Statue =

Ancient Aramean stele

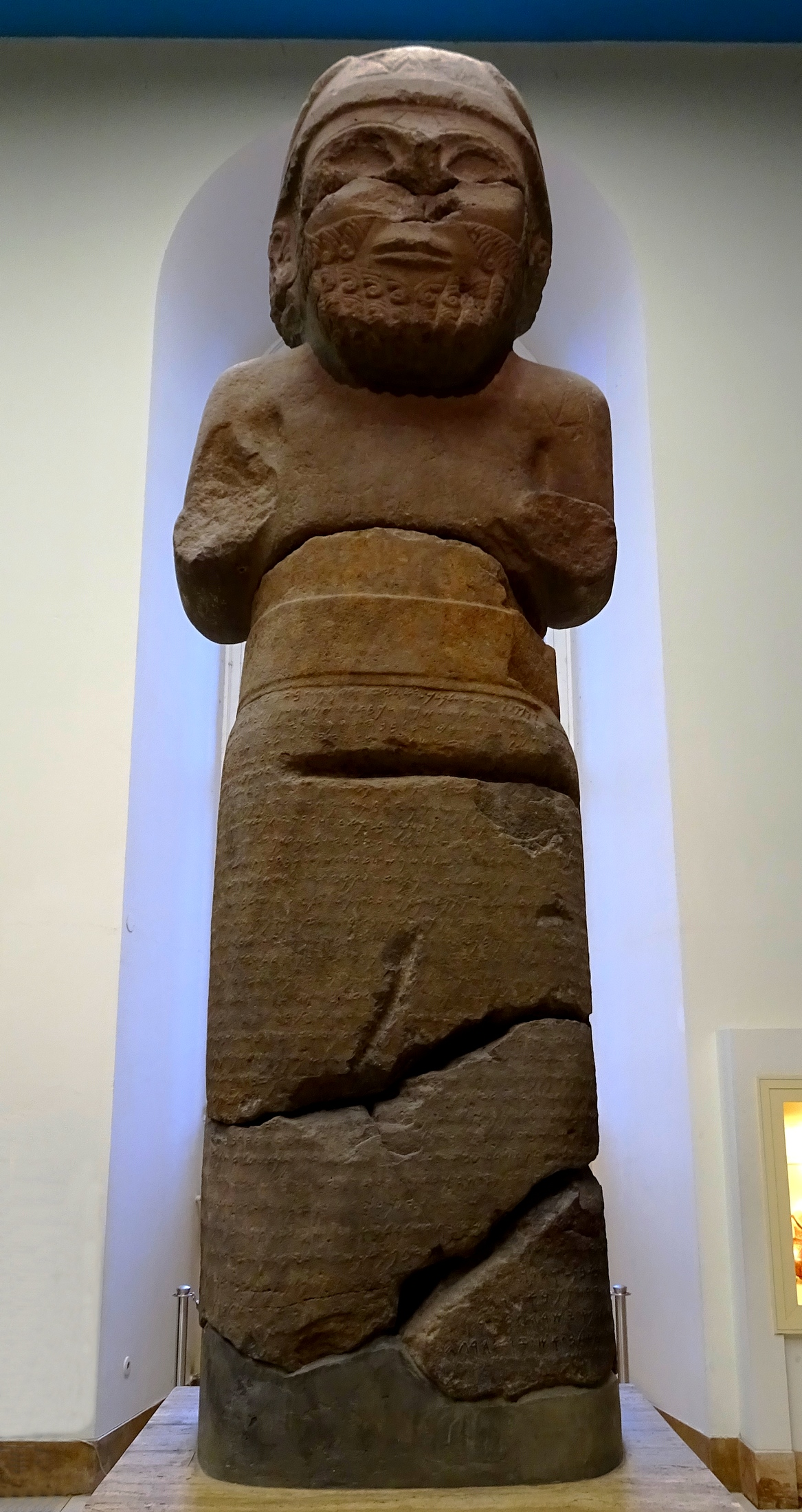
- Material: Basalt
- Height: 3.4 meters (11 ft) meters
- Width: 1.2 meters (3 ft 11 in)
- Depth: 75 centimeters (30 in)
- Period/culture: 8th century BC
- Discovered: 1890; Samʾal
- Present location: Vorderasiatisches Museum Berlin
- Culture: Aramean

The Hadad Statue is an 8th-century BC stele of King Panamuwa I, from the Kingdom of Bit-Gabbari (Samʾal). It currently occupies a prominent position in the Vorderasiatisches Museum Berlin. The statue depicts the god Hadad.

The inscription was discovered in 1890 in a village north east of Samʾal, during the period of the 1888-1902 German Oriental Society expeditions led by Felix von Luschan and Robert Koldewey. The 34 line inscription is written in the Samalian language, considered to be on a dialect intermediate between Phoenician and Aramaic.

== Translation ==
Capital letters indicate an untranslated proper name. The translation of the stele:

"I am Panamuwa, son of Qarli, king of YʔDY, who have erected this statue for Hadad in my eternal abode (burial chamber). The gods Hadad and El and Rašap and Rākib-El and Šamaš supported me. Hadad and El and Rākib-El and Šamaš and Rašap gave the scepter of dominion into my hands. Rašap supported me. So whatever I grasped with my hand […] and whatever I asked from the gods, they granted to me. The devastation(?) they restored. […] a land of barley […] a land of wheat and a land of garlic and a land of […]. Then […]. And […]. They cultivated the land and the vineyard. They dwelt there […].

I, Panamuwa, reigned on the throne of my father. Hadad gave into my hands a scepter of dominion. I cut off war and slander from the house of my father, and in my days also YʔDY ate and drank. In my days it was commanded throughout all my land to reconstruct ṬYRT and to reconstruct ZRRY and to build the villages of the dominion. Each one took his friend(?). Hadad and El and Rākib-El and Šamaš and ’Arqû-Rašap gave abundance. Greatness was granted to me and a sure covenant was concluded with me. In the days when I gained dominion, a gift-offering(?) was given to the gods; they took the land from my hand. Whatever I asked from the gods of the land, they gave to me. The gods of the land delighted in me, the son of Qarli.

Then Hadad gave the land for my […]. He singled me out to build and during my dominion, Hadad […] gave me the land to build. So I have built the land. I have erected this statue of Hadad and have built the place of Panamuwa, son of Qarli, king of YʔDY, with the statue—a burial chamber. Whoever of my sons (descendants) seizes the scepter, and sits on my throne, and maintains power, and sacrifices to this Hadad, […] an oath(?) and sacrifices this […] sacrifices to Hadad. Or, on the other hand, […] then he says: “May the soul (NBŠ) of Panamuwa eat with you and may the soul of Panamuwa drink with you.” May he remember eternally the soul of Panamuwa with Hadad. May he give this his sacrifice to Hadad. May he (i.e., Hadad) look favorably upon it. May it be a tribute for Hadad and for El and for Rākib-El and Šamaš and Rašap.

I am Panamuwa […] a house for the gods of this city. I built it and I caused the gods to dwell in it. During my reign, I allotted the gods a resting place. And they gave to me a seed of the bosom. […] whoever of my sons (descendants) seizes the scepter, and sits on my throne, and reigns over YʔDY, and maintains his power, and sacrifices to this Hadad, and does not remember the name of Panamuwa—who does not say: “May the soul of Panamuwa eat with Hadad, and may the soul of Panamuwa drink with Hadad”; then […] his sacrifice. May he (i.e., Hadad) not look favorably upon it, and whatever he asks, may Hadad not grant him. As for Hadad, may his wrath be poured out on him and may he not give to him to eat because of his rage; and may he withhold sleep from him in the night; and may terror be given to him. And may he not […] my kinsmen or relatives.

Whoever of my house seizes the scepter in YʔDY and sits on my throne and reigns in my place, may he not stretch his hand with the sword against anyone(?) of my house, either out of anger or out of violence. May he not do murder, either out of wrath or out of […]. And may no one be put to death, either by his bow or by his word or by his command.

But should (the future king’s) kinsman plot the destruction of one of his kinsmen or one of his relatives or one of his kinswomen, or should any member of my house plot destruction, then may (the king) assemble his male relatives and may he stand (the accused plotter) in the middle. Indeed, (the aggrieved victim of the plot) will pronounce his oath: “Your brother has caused my destruction!” If (the accused) denies it and (the aggrieved) lifts up his hands to the god of his father and says on his oath: “If I have put these words in the mouth of a stranger, say that my eyes are fixed or fearful, or that I have put my words in the mouth of enemies!”—then if (the accused) is male, may his male relatives be assembled and may they pound him with stones; and if (the accused) is female, then may her kinswomen be assembled and may they pound her with stones.

But if indeed ruin has struck him (a royal kinsman?) himself, then should your (i.e., the future king’s) eyes be weary of him on account of his bow or his power or his words or his instigation, then you […] his right […]. But if you slay him in violence or in anger, or you issue a decree against him, or you incite a stranger to slay him, may the gods […] slay […]"

== Text ==
The text of the inscription below is presented in George Albert Cooke's 1903 "Text-book of North-Semitic Inscriptions: Moabite, Hebrew, Phoenician, Aramaic, Nabataean, Palmyrene, Jewish".

1. 𐤀𐤍𐤊 𐤐𐤍𐤌𐤅 · 𐤁𐤓 · 𐤒𐤓𐤋 · 𐤌𐤋𐤊 · 𐤉𐤀𐤃𐤉 · 𐤆𐤉 · 𐤄𐤒𐤌𐤕 · 𐤍𐤑𐤁 · 𐤆𐤍 · 𐤋𐤄𐤃𐤃 · 𐤁𐤏𐤋𐤌𐤉

2. 𐤒𐤌𐤅 · 𐤏𐤌𐤉̇ · 𐤀̇𐤋𐤄𐤅 · 𐤄𐤃𐤃 · 𐤅𐤀𐤋 · 𐤅𐤓𐤔𐤐 · 𐤅𐤓𐤊𐤁𐤀𐤋 · 𐤅𐤔𐤌𐤔 · 𐤅𐤍𐤕𐤍 · 𐤁𐤉𐤃𐤉 · 𐤄𐤃𐤃 · 𐤅𐤀𐤋 ·
3. 𐤅𐤓𐤊𐤁𐤀𐤋 · 𐤅𐤔𐤌𐤔 · 𐤅𐤓𐤔𐤐 · 𐤇𐤈𐤓 · 𐤇𐤋𐤁𐤁𐤄 · 𐤅𐤒𐤌 · 𐤏𐤌𐤉 · 𐤓𐤔𐤐 · 𐤐𐤌𐤆 · 𐤀𐤇𐤆 ·
4. 𐤁𐤉𐤃....𐤄̇𐤀 · 𐤐𐤋𐤇̇..· 𐤅𐤌𐤆 · 𐤀𐤔𐤀[𐤋 · 𐤌𐤍 · ]𐤀𐤋𐤄𐤉 · 𐤉𐤕𐤍𐤅 · 𐤋𐤉 · 𐤅𐤔𐤍𐤌 · 𐤇̇𐤅𐤉𐤅 ·
5. 𐤋̇. 𐤀𐤓𐤒 · 𐤔𐤏𐤓𐤉 · 𐤄𐤀𐤋 ·........................
6. 𐤀𐤓𐤒 · 𐤇𐤈𐤉 𐤅𐤀𐤓𐤒 𐤔𐤌𐤉.....................
7. 𐤅𐤀𐤓𐤒 · ...........𐤀𐤆 · 𐤁̇.𐤓̇𐤕...𐤉̇𐤌𐤉 𐤅̇.....𐤉 · 𐤉𐤏𐤁𐤃𐤅 · 𐤀𐤓𐤒 · 𐤅𐤊𐤓𐤌 ·
8. 𐤔𐤌 · 𐤉𐤔[𐤁].........𐤌̇ · 𐤐𐤍𐤌𐤅 · 𐤂𐤌 · 𐤉𐤔𐤁𐤕 · 𐤏𐤋 · 𐤌𐤔𐤁 · 𐤀𐤁𐤉 · 𐤅𐤍𐤕𐤍 · 𐤄𐤃𐤃 · 𐤁𐤉𐤃𐤉
9. 𐤇𐤈𐤓 · 𐤇𐤋[𐤁𐤁𐤄 ·]........𐤕 · 𐤇𐤓𐤁 · 𐤅𐤋𐤔𐤍 · 𐤌𐤍 · 𐤁𐤉𐤕 · 𐤀𐤁𐤉 · 𐤅𐤁𐤉𐤌𐤉 · 𐤂𐤌 · 𐤀𐤊𐤋 · 𐤅𐤔𐤕𐤀 · 𐤉̇𐤀̇𐤃̇𐤉
10. 𐤅𐤁𐤉𐤌𐤉 · 𐤉𐤕𐤌𐤓......𐤒̇𐤉 · 𐤋𐤍𐤑𐤁 · 𐤒̇𐤉𐤓̇𐤕 · 𐤅𐤋𐤍𐤑𐤁 · 𐤆𐤓𐤓𐤉 · 𐤅𐤋𐤁𐤍𐤉 · 𐤊𐤐𐤉𐤓𐤉 · 𐤇𐤋𐤁𐤁...𐤉̇𐤒𐤇 ·
11. 𐤀𐤔 · 𐤓̇𐤏̇𐤉̇𐤄 · 𐤅̇𐤉𐤕̇𐤓̇ · 𐤄̇𐤃𐤃̇ · [𐤅]𐤀𐤋 𐤅𐤓𐤊𐤁𐤀𐤋 · 𐤅𐤔𐤌𐤔 · 𐤅𐤀𐤓𐤒𐤓𐤔𐤐 · 𐤅𐤊𐤁𐤓̇𐤅 · 𐤍𐤕𐤍𐤄 · 𐤋𐤉 · 𐤅𐤀𐤌̇𐤍̇ · .𐤊𐤓̇𐤕̇
12. 𐤁𐤉 · 𐤅𐤁𐤉𐤌𐤉 · 𐤇𐤋𐤁𐤕...𐤕.𐤉̇𐤄𐤁 𐤋̇𐤀𐤋𐤄𐤉 · 𐤅𐤌𐤕 · 𐤉𐤒𐤇𐤅 · 𐤌𐤍 · 𐤉𐤃𐤉 · 𐤅𐤌𐤄 · 𐤀𐤔𐤀𐤋 · 𐤌𐤍 · 𐤀𐤋𐤄𐤉 · 𐤌𐤕 · 𐤉𐤕𐤓̇
13. 𐤋𐤉 𐤅𐤀𐤓𐤒𐤅 · 𐤅...... · 𐤒𐤓𐤋 · 𐤀𐤋𐤄𐤉 · 𐤌𐤕 · 𐤐𐤋𐤅 · 𐤍𐤕𐤍 · 𐤄𐤃𐤃 · 𐤌𐤕 · 𐤋..𐤕̇𐤉 · 𐤒𐤓𐤍𐤉 · 𐤋𐤁𐤍𐤀 · 𐤅𐤁𐤇𐤋𐤁𐤁𐤕𐤉 ·
14. 𐤍𐤕𐤍 · 𐤌𐤕 · 𐤄̇𐤃̇[𐤃 · ....𐤋]𐤁𐤍𐤀 · 𐤐𐤁𐤍𐤉𐤕 · 𐤌𐤕 · 𐤅[𐤄]𐤒𐤌𐤕 · 𐤍𐤑𐤁 · 𐤄𐤃𐤃 · 𐤆𐤍 · 𐤅𐤌𐤒𐤌 · 𐤐𐤍𐤌𐤅 · 𐤁𐤓 · 𐤒𐤓𐤋 · 𐤌𐤋𐤊 ·
15. 𐤉𐤀𐤃𐤉 · 𐤏𐤌 · 𐤍𐤑𐤁 · 𐤇̇𐤃̇..𐤌𐤍 𐤌𐤍 · 𐤁𐤍𐤉 · 𐤉𐤀𐤇𐤆[· 𐤇𐤈]𐤓 · 𐤅𐤉𐤔𐤁 · 𐤏𐤋 · 𐤌𐤔𐤁𐤉 · 𐤅𐤉𐤎𐤏𐤃̇ · 𐤀𐤁𐤓𐤅 · 𐤅𐤉𐤆𐤁𐤇 ·
16. 𐤄𐤃𐤃 · 𐤆𐤍̇....𐤉̇...𐤉̇..𐤍̇𐤔𐤉 · 𐤅𐤉𐤆𐤁𐤇 · .....𐤌 · ..𐤀 𐤉𐤆𐤁𐤇 · 𐤄𐤃𐤃 · 𐤅𐤉𐤆𐤊𐤓 · 𐤀𐤔𐤌 · 𐤄𐤃𐤃 · 𐤀𐤅 ·
17. 𐤀 · 𐤐𐤀 · 𐤉𐤀𐤌𐤓 · [𐤕𐤀𐤊]𐤋̇ 𐤍̇𐤁̇𐤔 · 𐤐𐤍𐤌̇𐤅 · 𐤏𐤌𐤊 · 𐤅𐤕𐤔[𐤕𐤉 · 𐤍]𐤁𐤔 𐤐𐤍𐤌𐤅 𐤏𐤌𐤊 · 𐤏𐤃 𐤉𐤆𐤊𐤓 · 𐤍𐤁𐤔 · 𐤐𐤍𐤌𐤅 · 𐤏𐤌̇
18. [𐤄]𐤃̇𐤃 · 𐤉̇.......𐤆𐤁𐤇𐤄̇ 𐤆𐤀 · 𐤐𐤕𐤊.....[𐤉]𐤓𐤒𐤉 · 𐤁𐤄 · 𐤔𐤉 · 𐤋𐤄𐤃𐤃 𐤅𐤋𐤀𐤋 · 𐤅𐤋𐤓𐤊𐤁𐤀𐤋 · 𐤅𐤋𐤔𐤌𐤔
19. 𐤍̇.[𐤐]𐤍̇𐤌̇𐤅̇...𐤁......𐤉 · 𐤒.𐤆𐤀 · 𐤐𐤁...𐤄 · 𐤅𐤄𐤅𐤔𐤁𐤕 · 𐤁𐤄 · 𐤀̇𐤋𐤄̇𐤉̇ · 𐤅𐤁𐤇𐤋𐤁𐤁𐤕𐤄̇ · 𐤇𐤍𐤀𐤕......
20. 𐤍𐤕𐤍𐤅 · 𐤋𐤉 · 𐤆𐤓𐤏 · 𐤇𐤁𐤀 .......𐤉..𐤀̇𐤌... · 𐤁𐤍𐤉 · 𐤉𐤀𐤇𐤆 · 𐤇𐤈𐤓 · 𐤅𐤉𐤔𐤁 · 𐤏𐤋 · 𐤌𐤔𐤁𐤉̇ 𐤌̇𐤋𐤊......
21. 𐤏𐤋 · 𐤉𐤀̇𐤃̇𐤉̇ · 𐤅𐤉𐤎𐤏𐤃 · 𐤀𐤁𐤓𐤅 · 𐤅̇𐤉𐤆̇𐤁̇𐤇̇ [· 𐤄𐤃𐤃 · 𐤆𐤍 · 𐤅𐤉𐤆𐤊]𐤓 · 𐤀𐤔𐤌 · 𐤐𐤍𐤌𐤅 · 𐤉𐤀𐤌𐤓 · 𐤕𐤀𐤊𐤋 · 𐤍𐤁𐤔 𐤐̇[𐤍]𐤌̇[𐤅] ·
22. 𐤏𐤌 · 𐤄𐤃𐤃 · 𐤅𐤕𐤔𐤕𐤉 · 𐤍𐤁𐤔 · 𐤐𐤍𐤌𐤅 · 𐤏𐤌 · 𐤄[𐤃]𐤃 · 𐤄𐤀 · ............𐤇𐤄𐤍 · 𐤆𐤁𐤇𐤄 · 𐤅𐤀𐤋 · 𐤉𐤓𐤒𐤉 · 𐤁𐤄 𐤅𐤌𐤆 ·
23. 𐤉𐤔𐤀𐤋 · 𐤀𐤋 · 𐤉𐤕𐤍 · 𐤋𐤄 𐤄𐤃𐤃 · 𐤅𐤄𐤃𐤃 · 𐤇𐤓𐤀 · 𐤋𐤉̇𐤕𐤊̇𐤄..................𐤀𐤋 · 𐤉𐤕𐤍 · 𐤋𐤄 · 𐤋𐤀𐤊𐤋 · 𐤁𐤓̇𐤂̇𐤆
24. 𐤅𐤔𐤍𐤄 · 𐤋𐤌𐤍𐤏 · 𐤌𐤍𐤄 · 𐤁𐤋𐤉𐤋𐤀 · 𐤅𐤃̇𐤋𐤇̇ · 𐤍𐤕𐤍 · 𐤋𐤄 ..𐤉.............𐤀𐤉𐤇..𐤌𐤅𐤃𐤃𐤉 · 𐤌𐤅𐤌𐤕̇..𐤕̇𐤉
25. 𐤉𐤀𐤇𐤆 · 𐤇𐤈𐤓 · 𐤁𐤉𐤀𐤃[𐤉] · 𐤅𐤉𐤔𐤁 · 𐤏𐤋 · 𐤌𐤔𐤁𐤉 · 𐤅𐤉𐤌𐤋[𐤊 · ....𐤅𐤉𐤔𐤋]𐤇 · 𐤉𐤃𐤄 · 𐤁𐤇𐤓𐤁 · 𐤁.....𐤕̇𐤉 · 𐤀𐤅 ·
26. 𐤇𐤌̇𐤎 · 𐤀𐤋 · 𐤉𐤄𐤓𐤂 · 𐤀𐤅 · 𐤁𐤓𐤂𐤆 · 𐤀𐤅 · 𐤏𐤋 · 𐤀.....𐤀 · 𐤋̇...𐤉 · 𐤌̇𐤅̇𐤌𐤕 · 𐤀𐤅 · 𐤏𐤋 · 𐤒𐤔𐤕𐤄 · 𐤀𐤅 · 𐤏𐤋 · 𐤀𐤌𐤓𐤕𐤄 ·........
27. 𐤇𐤄 · 𐤉𐤓𐤔𐤉 · 𐤔𐤇𐤕 · 𐤁𐤀𐤔𐤓 · 𐤇𐤃 · 𐤀𐤉𐤇𐤉𐤄 · 𐤀𐤅 · 𐤁𐤀𐤔𐤓 · 𐤇𐤃 · 𐤌𐤅𐤃𐤃𐤉𐤄 · 𐤀𐤅 · 𐤁𐤀𐤔𐤓 ·.................
28. 𐤇𐤃𐤄 · 𐤀𐤉𐤇𐤕[𐤄.........𐤉𐤓𐤔𐤉 · 𐤔𐤇𐤕 · 𐤉𐤂𐤍𐤁 𐤀𐤉𐤇𐤉𐤄 · 𐤆𐤊𐤓𐤉 · 𐤅𐤉𐤒𐤌 · 𐤅𐤕𐤄 · 𐤁𐤌𐤑𐤏𐤄 · 𐤌𐤕 · 𐤍𐤔𐤄
29. 𐤉𐤀𐤌𐤓 · 𐤀𐤇𐤊𐤌 · 𐤄𐤔𐤇𐤕 · 𐤅𐤄𐤍......𐤀 · 𐤉𐤃𐤉𐤄 · 𐤋𐤀𐤋𐤄 · 𐤀𐤁𐤄 · 𐤍𐤔𐤄 · 𐤉𐤀𐤌𐤓 · 𐤄𐤍 · 𐤀𐤌 · 𐤔𐤌𐤕 · 𐤀𐤌𐤓𐤕 · 𐤀𐤋 · 𐤁𐤐𐤌 ·
30. 𐤆𐤓 · 𐤀𐤌𐤓 · 𐤒𐤌 · 𐤏𐤉𐤍𐤉 · 𐤀𐤅 · 𐤃𐤋𐤇 · 𐤀𐤅......𐤉 · 𐤁𐤐𐤌 · 𐤀𐤍𐤔𐤉 𐤑̇𐤓𐤉 · 𐤐𐤄̇𐤍𐤅 · 𐤆𐤊𐤓 · 𐤄𐤀 · 𐤋𐤕𐤂𐤌𐤓𐤅 · 𐤀𐤉𐤇𐤄
31. 𐤆𐤊𐤓𐤅 · 𐤐𐤋𐤊𐤕𐤔𐤄 · 𐤁𐤀𐤁𐤍𐤉 · 𐤅𐤄𐤍𐤅 𐤓.........𐤓̇𐤍 · 𐤀𐤉𐤇𐤕𐤄 𐤐𐤋𐤊𐤕𐤔𐤍𐤄 · 𐤁𐤀𐤁𐤍𐤉 · 𐤅𐤄𐤍𐤅̇ · 𐤋𐤅 · 𐤔𐤇𐤕 ·
32. 𐤁𐤀𐤔𐤓𐤄 · 𐤅𐤕𐤋𐤏𐤉 · 𐤏𐤉𐤍𐤊 · 𐤁𐤀.𐤁𐤁̇.........𐤏𐤋 · 𐤒𐤔𐤕𐤄 𐤀𐤅 · 𐤏𐤋 · 𐤂𐤁𐤓𐤕𐤄 · 𐤀𐤅 · 𐤏𐤋 · 𐤀𐤌𐤓𐤕𐤄 ·
33. 𐤀𐤅 · 𐤏𐤋 · 𐤍𐤃𐤁𐤄 · 𐤀𐤕 · 𐤐𐤀 · 𐤉𐤔𐤓𐤄 · 𐤁..𐤓.............𐤅 · 𐤕𐤄𐤓𐤂𐤄 · 𐤁𐤇𐤌. · [𐤀𐤅 · ] 𐤁𐤇𐤌𐤀 · 𐤀𐤅 ·

34. 𐤕𐤇𐤒 · 𐤏𐤋𐤉𐤄 · 𐤀𐤅 · 𐤕𐤀𐤋𐤁 · 𐤀𐤔 · 𐤆𐤓 · 𐤋𐤄𐤓𐤂𐤄 · 𐤉......... 𐤌̇𐤅.............

== Gallery ==
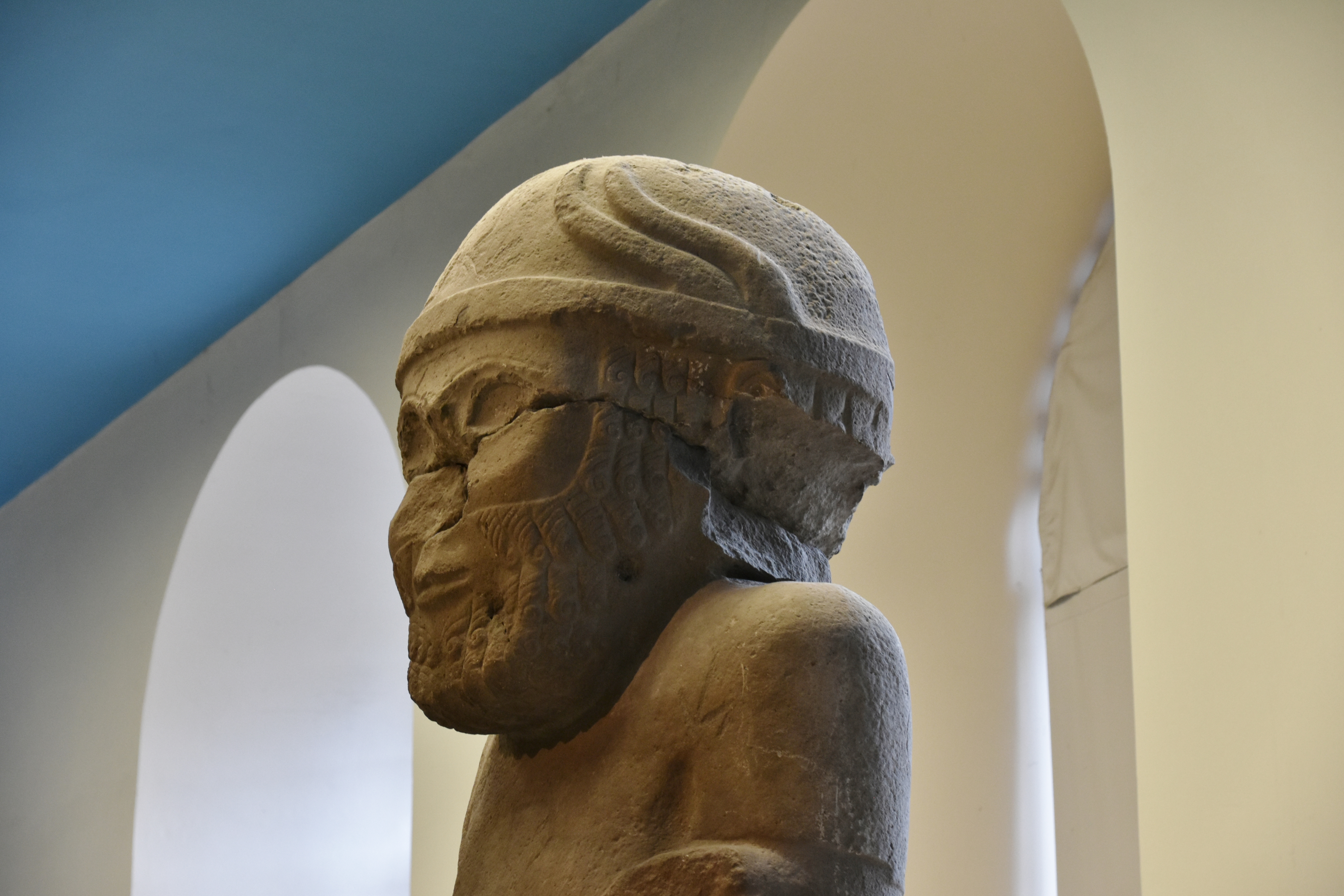

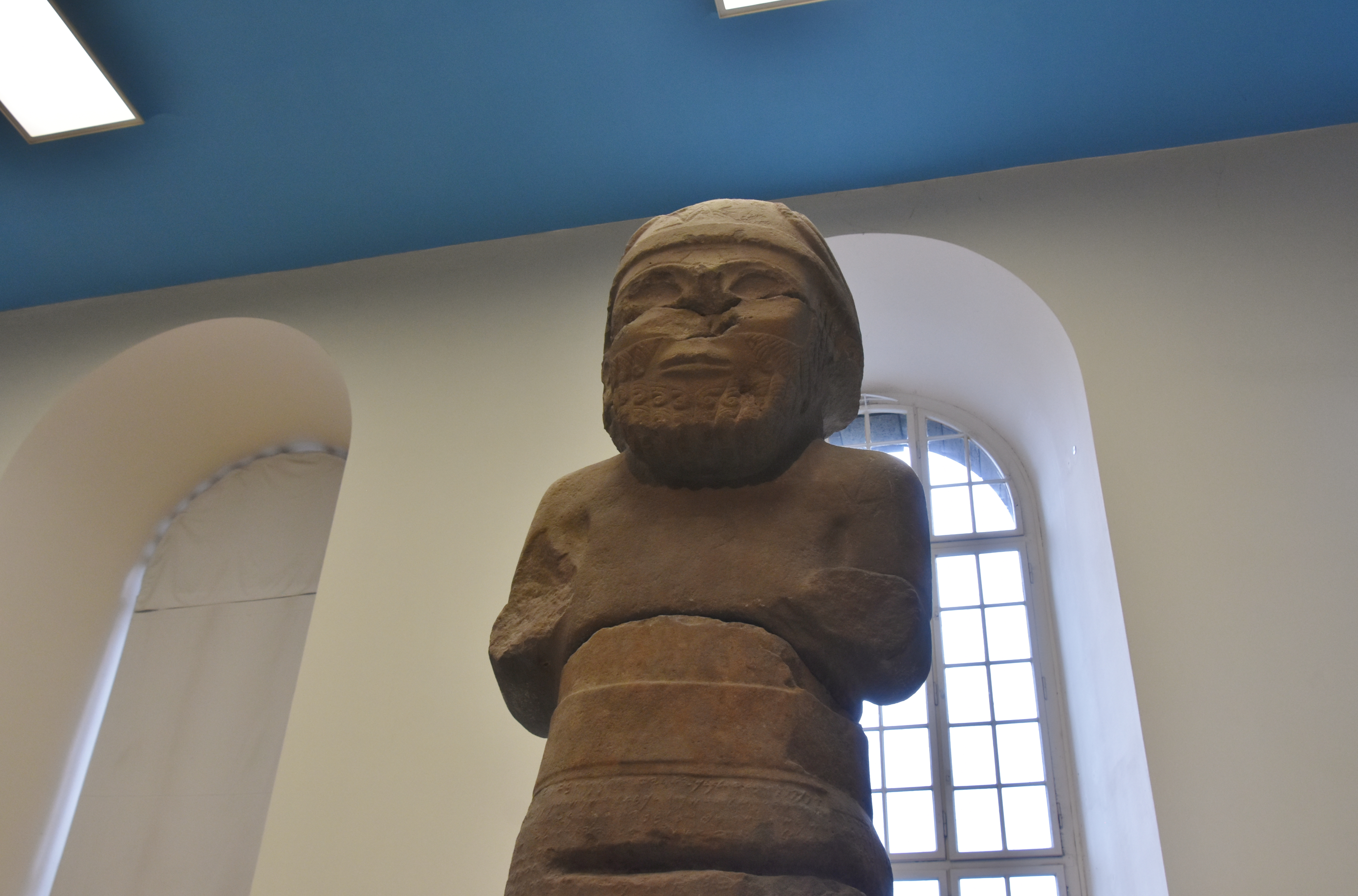

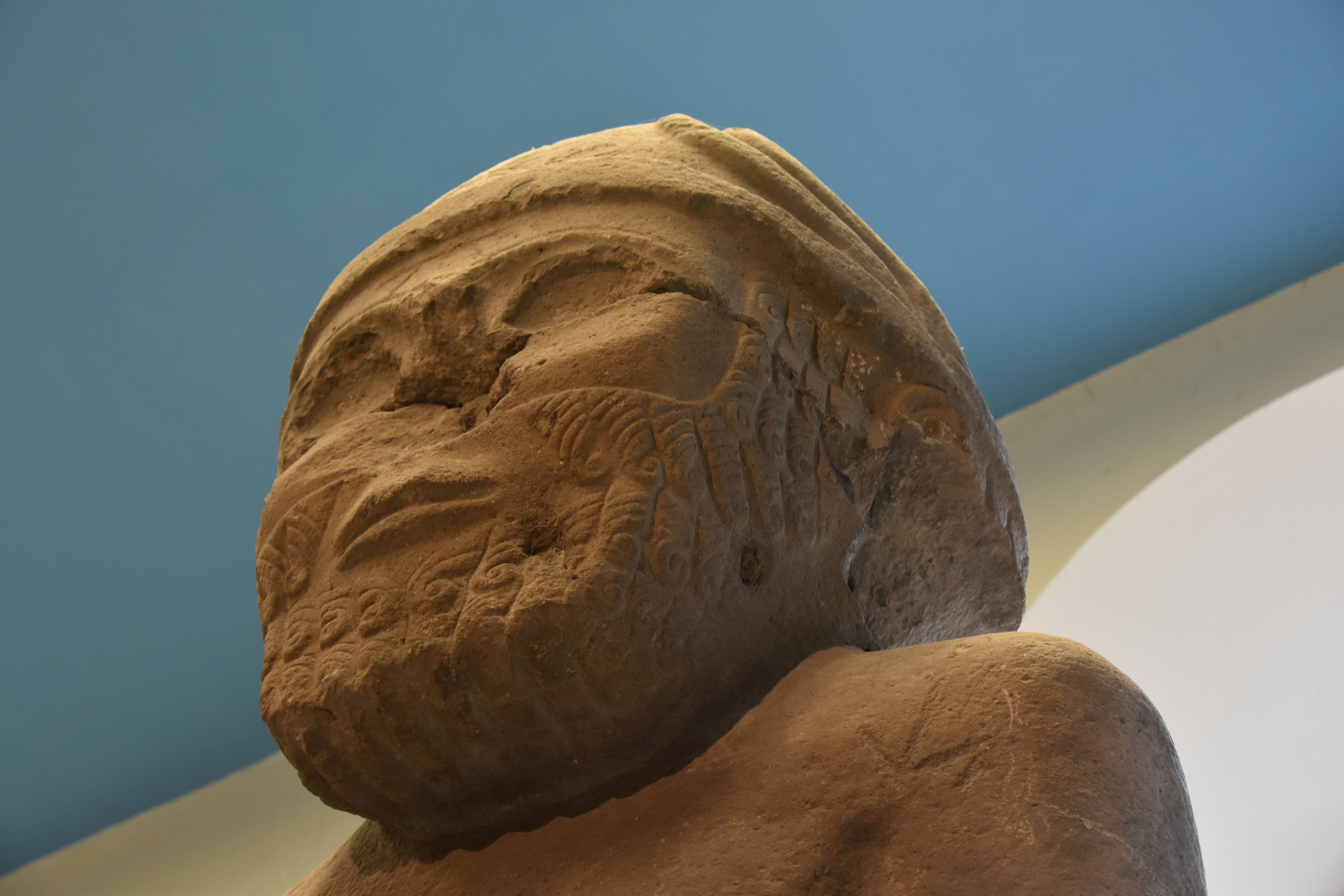

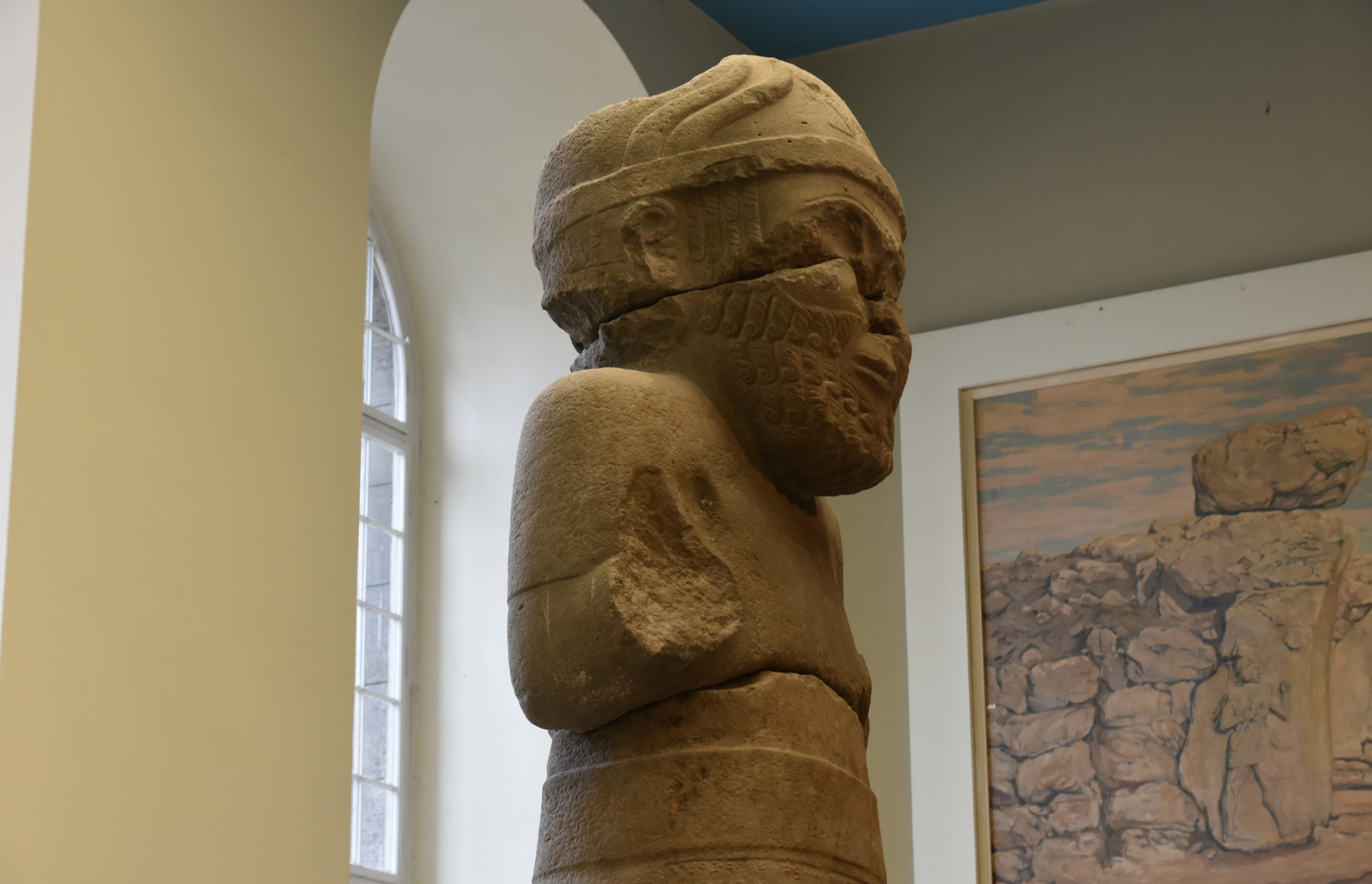

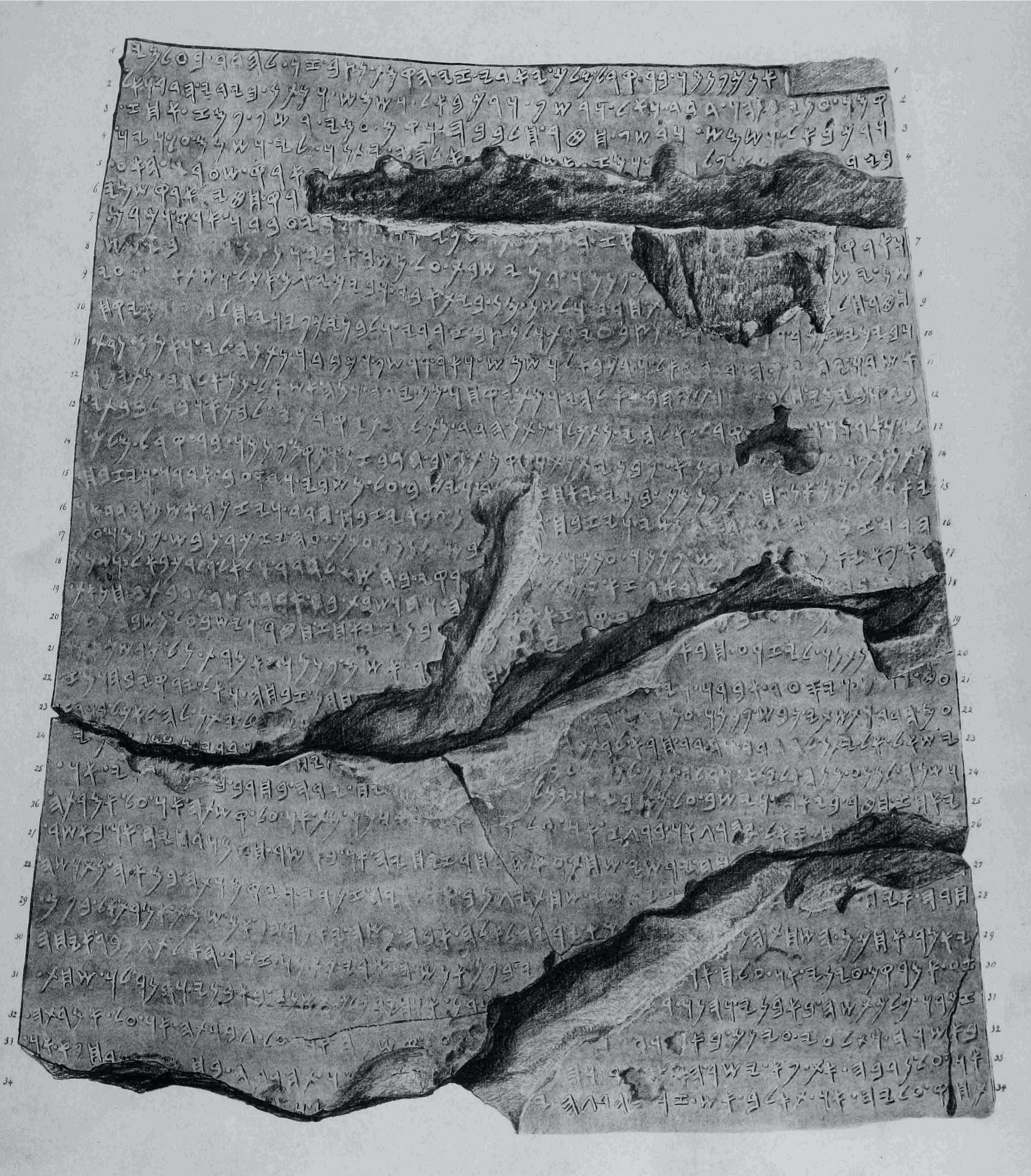
The inscription (KAI 214)

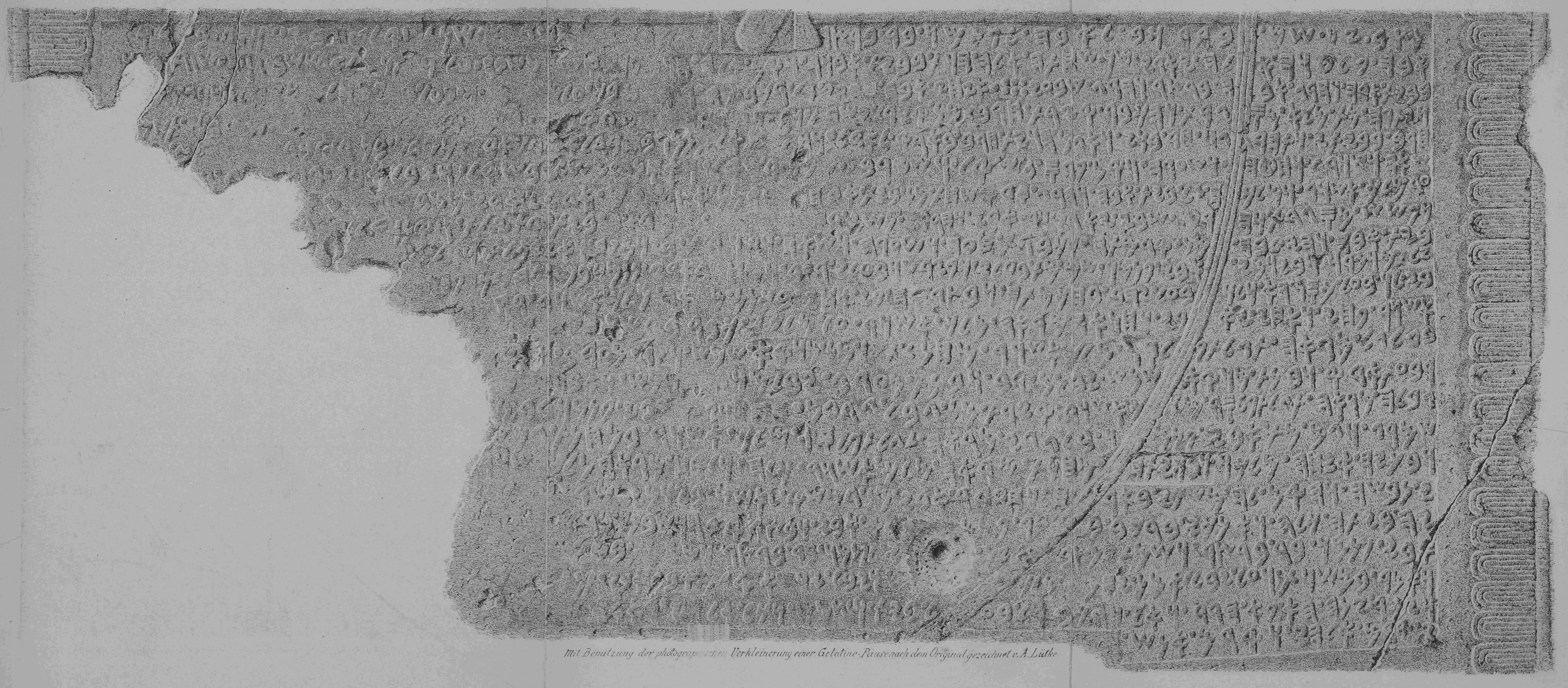
Torso inscription (KAI 215) – Panamuwa II inscription

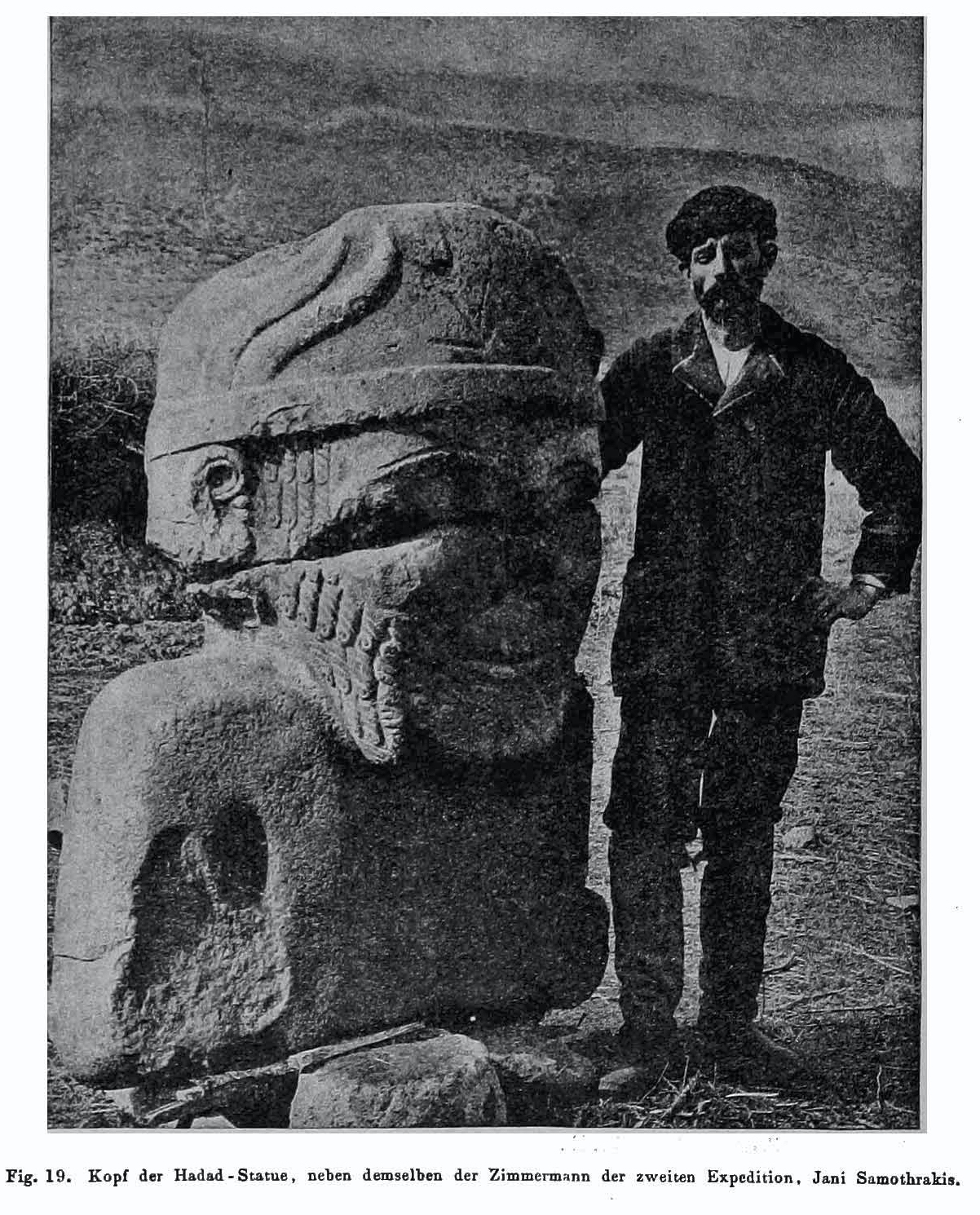
Discovery of the head

== Current Research ==
Since 2019, an international research team led by Regine Hunziker-Rodewald, Konstantin Klein and Dominik L. Michels has re-examined the inscription using polynomial texture mapping (PTM), photogrammetry and 3D scanning. The collaboration involves scholars in Strasbourg, Amsterdam, at KAUST, Lebanon and Berlin, and has received support from the Arab-German Young Academy (AGYA), funded by Germany's Federal Ministry of Research, Technology and Space (BMFTR). The research aims to clarify damaged or previously unreadable letter traces and to prepare a new edition of the inscription.

== Bibliography ==
- Aioanei, A. C.; Hunziker-Rodewald, R. R.; Klein, K. M.; Michels, D. L. (2024). "Deep Aramaic: Towards a synthetic data paradigm enabling machine learning in epigraphy". PLOS ONE. 19 (4). e0299297. arXiv:2310.07310. Bibcode:2024PLoSO..1999297A. doi:10.1371/journal.pone.0299297. PMC 11029639. PMID 38640100.
- Aioanei, A. C.; Klein, J.; Klein, K. M.; Hunziker-Rodewald, R. R.; Michels, D. L. (2026). "DeepHadad: Enhancing Readability of Damaged Inscriptions with Synthetic Data". ACM Journal on Computing and Cultural Heritage. 19 (1): 1–18. doi:10.1145/3727623.
- Belger, C. (1893). "Sendschirli II". Berliner philologische Wochenschrift. 13: 355–356, 385–388.
- Derenbourg, H. (1893). "Pînamou, fils de Karîl". REJ. 26: 135–138.
- Halévy, J. (1893). "Deux inscriptions sémitiques de Zindjîrlî". RevSém. 1: 77–90.
- Luschan, F. von (1893). "Fünf Bildwerke aus Gerdschin". Ausgrabungen in Sendschirli. Vol. 1. Berlin: W. Spemann.
- Müller, D. H. (1893). "Die altsemitischen Inschriften von Sendschirli". WZKM. 7: 33–70, 113–140.
- Sachau, E. (1892). "Zur historischen Geographie von Nordsyrien". SPAW. 21: 313–338.
- Schmidt, N. (1894). "Immortality and the Hadad Statue". Journal of Biblical Literature. 13 (1): 16–18. doi:10.2307/3268911. JSTOR 3268911.
