= Misor =

Name of Phoenician deity or mythological ancestor

Misor was the name of a deity appearing in a theogeny provided by Roman era Phoenician writer Philo of Byblos in an account preserved by Eusebius in Praeparatio Evangelica, and attributed to the still earlier Sanchuniathon. He was one of two children of the deities Amunos and Magos. The other named was Sydyk. It is said that these two were the first to discover the use of salt. The names "Misor" and "Sydyk" mean "Straight" and "Just" (or, in another translation, "Well-freed" and "Just").

Misor's son was named Taautus, and believed to be the inventor of the first written alphabet.

== See also ==
- Sydyk
