= Ancient Tell of Beirut =

Early settlement of Beirut, Lebanon

Coordinates: 33°53′55″N 35°30′28″E

The Ancient Tell is a Tell in downtown Beirut, Lebanon. In the 1990s, the effort to rebuild Beirut following the Lebanese Civil War provided archaeologists with the unique opportunity to investigate the Tell, revealing many layers of the city.

== History ==
Around 2500 B.C., Canaanite Biruta was a small town, overlooking a natural bay where ships sought shelter. Local and foreign goods were traded, while the ships renewed their supplies. Between 1200 and 1000 B.C., Phoenician Beirut/Biruta regained its role as a maritime center, and established two harbors and extended trade links throughout the Mediterranean and beyond. Large quantities of crushed rock were piled against the fortifications of the old Canaanite city wall in order to create a stone-paved embankment (glacis). The eastern entrance has survived, along with its stairways leading up to a gate in the enclosure wall.

After the transition from Ptolemaic to Seleucid influence, Beirut became known as ‘Laodicea of Phoenicia.’ During this period, a wall was built around the Tell. The remains of three Hellenistic towers, cut into the Phoenician glacis, reflect that heyday in Beirut’s history. In Roman Berytus, the sacred and administrative center was relocated from the Tell to the Forum, beneath today's Etoile Square. Later, in the Umayyad period, the northern part of the Tell regained strategic importance with the construction of fortifications overlooking the harbor.

During the 1930s, a monumental gateway and grand stairway were planned to connect Martyrs’ Square to the harbor's main quayside. When the execution of this plan failed, cinemas, warehouses and offices were built instead, destroying a considerable section of the Tell.

== Timeline ==
2500 B.C.: Canaanite Biruta was a small trading town where ships sought shelter.

Phoenician times: Establishment of two harbors which extended Biruta's trade links beyond the Mediterranean.

Roman times: Relocation of the sacred and administrative center of Berytus from the Tell to the Forum.

Umayyad period: Northern part of the Tell regained strategic importance with the construction of fortifications by the harbor.

Crusader period: Enlargement of the fort to a castle.

1840: Castle was bombarded by the British fleet and lost its strategic significance.

1900: The modernization of the harbor led to the construction of a railway station on the site of the demolished castle.

1930s: Plans to connect Martyrs' Square to the Harbor's main quayside failed. Cinemas, warehouses and offices were built instead on the site of the Tell.

== See also ==
- Beirut Central District
- Martyrs' Square, Beirut
- Beirut Castle
- Phoenico-Persian gate of ancient Tell
- Canaanite gate of ancient Tell
- Canaanite tombs of ancient Tell

== Literature ==
- Leila Badre, Bey 003, Beirut Preliminary Report, Excavations of the American University of Beirut Museum 1993-1996,
- Curvers, Hans H. (2001-2) “The Lower Town in Beirut (1200 – 300 BC), A preliminary synthesis”, Proceedings of ARAM Twelfth International Conference (American University of Beirut 13–16 April 1999), Aram 13-14: 51-72.
- Finkbeiner, Uwe and Sader, Helen (1997) “Bey 020 Preliminary Report on the Excavations 1995”, Bulletin d’Archéologie et d’Architecture Libanaises 2:114–166.
- Gavin, Angus and Malouf, Ramez (1996) Beirut reborn: the restoration and development of the Central District, Academy Editions, London.
- Karam, Naji (1997) « Bey 013 rapport préliminaire », Bulletin d’Archéologie et d’Architecture Libanaises 2:95–113.
