= Canaanite tombs of ancient Tell =

Ancient rock-cut tombs in Beirut, Lebanon

The Canaanite Tombs of ancient Tell are a historical monument located in downtown Beirut, Lebanon.

== Overview ==
A large rock-cut tomb yielded artifacts including bronze weapons, personal ornaments and imported stone vessels from Egypt. Two burial jars containing the remains of a baby and the skeleton of little girl were also found near the tomb.

== Construction ==
A large rock-cut tomb yielded artifacts including bronze weapons, personal ornaments and stone vessels imported from Egypt. A preserved plastered floor, a column base and a few column drums may be all that remains of a public building, palace or temple. Two burial jars were found at this site: one contained the remains of a newborn baby, and the other held the skeleton of a 4-year-old girl, with a necklace of red cornelian, rock crystal, gold, and red garnet beads which are presently displayed in Beirut’s National Museum.

== History ==
A large rock-cut tomb yielded artifacts including bronze weapons, personal ornaments and stone vessels, the latter imported from Egypt. Two caves cut out of the bedrock yielded similar finds, including pottery from Cyprus. The construction of fortifications since the 7th century A.D. destroyed many layers of the Tell, but left the tombs intact.

== See also ==
- Ancient Tell
- Beirut National Museum
