= Phoenico-Persian gate of ancient Tell =

The Phoenico-Persian Gate of ancient Tell is a monument located in downtown Beirut, Lebanon.

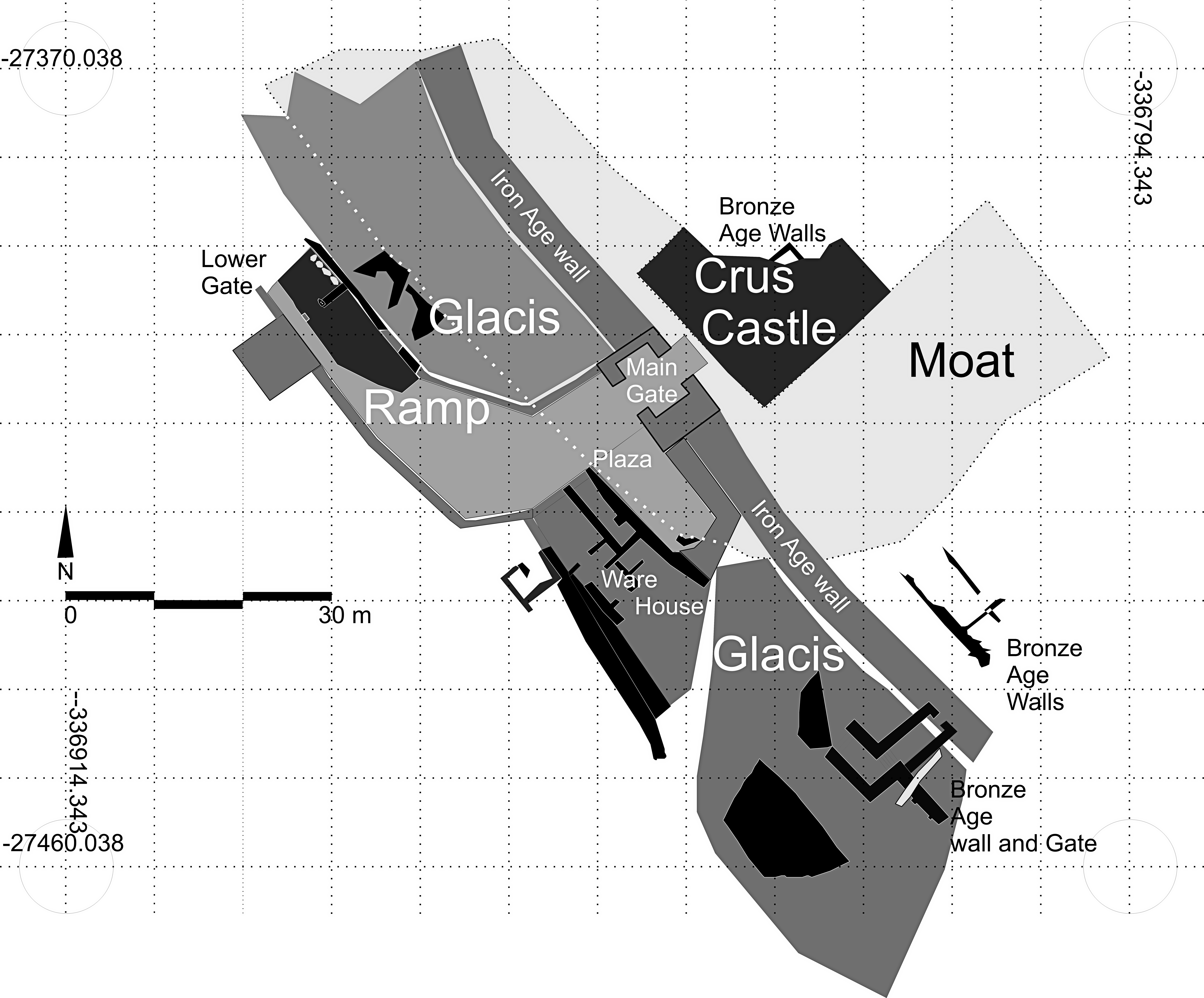
Reconstruction of the Heavily Fragmented Phoenico-Persian Western Gate (BEY 003 and BEY 032)

== Overview ==
A city gate complex with storage rooms dating from the first millennium BC was discovered during the mid-1990s excavations. It separated the upper town from the lower town around the harbor.

== Construction ==
During the first millennium B.C., a stone-paved ramp linked the western harbor to the upper town. Archaeologists discovered a city gate complex in this area. A preserved threshold and pivot-stone are part of the first gate, which gave access to the complex. A second paved ramp led up to an inner gate. Later, the construction of Beirut’s fortifications from the 7th century A.D. onwards, destroyed this gate. A cobble pavement is all that remains. The gate complex separated the upper town from the lower town, around the harbor, where installations with circular silos and ovens, workshops and houses were built.

== History ==
During the first millennium B.C., a stone-paved ramp linked the western harbor to the upper town. Archaeologists discovered a city gate complex in this area. Goods traded in the harbor appear to have been kept in its storage rooms. A preserved threshold and pivot-stone are part of the first gate, which gave access to the complex. A second paved ramp led up to an inner gate. Later, the construction of Beirut’s fortifications from the 7th century A.D. onwards, destroyed this gate. A cobble pavement is all that remains. The gate complex separated the upper town from the lower town, around the harbor, where installations with circular silos and ovens, workshops and houses were built.

== Timeline ==
1st millennium B.C.: existence of a city gate complex linking the western harbor to the upper town, allowing traded goods to be kept in storage rooms.

7th century A.D. onwards: construction of Beirut’s fortifications which destroyed the gate.

== See also ==
- Ancient Tell
- Phoenician
