= Canaanite gate of ancient Tell =

Monument located in downtown Beirut, Lebanon

Coordinates: 33°53′52″N 35°30′31″E

The Canaanite Gate of ancient Tell is a monument located in downtown Beirut, Lebanon.

== Overview ==
A gate and an L-shaped passage (circa 1500 BC) were discovered during the mid-1990s excavations. They led to a fortified enclosure around the temple and the palace of Canaanite Biruta (Beirut).

== Construction ==
Around 1500 BC, Biruta was a fortified city; entering a fortified enclosure that surrounded the temple and palace conveyed order, power and prosperity. The visitor had to pass through a gate and a narrow passage. The L-shaped form of the passage had defensive and ceremonial origins.

== History ==
Around 1500 BC, the city wall and its gates conveyed order, power and prosperity in Canaanite Biruta. To enter a fortified enclosure that surrounded the temple and palace, the visitor had to pass through a gate and narrow passage. The L-shaped form of the passage had both defensive and ceremonial origins. In times of war, when the city was under siege, the angle of the passageway prevented invaders from hoisting a battering ram to destroy the gate. In times of peace, a visitor was not afforded direct access to the temple or the palace, but had to make a turn in the passageway. The latter opened onto a monumental stairway, which led to the place of authority.

== Timeline ==
1500 BC: The city wall and its gates conveyed order, power and prosperity in Canaanite Biruta.

== See also ==
- Ancient Tell
