= Mut-bisir =

- Allegiance: Kingdom of Upper Mesopotamia
- Service years: c. 1790 BC

Mut-bisir or Mutu-bisir (in Akkadian Cuneiform: mu-ut-bi-si-ir, in transliterated Amorite: mut-biśir, "man of Biśri"; fl. c. 1790 BC) was a senior military official to the ruler Shamshi-Adad I of the Kingdom of Upper Mesopotamia. His name appears repeatedly in the Mari letters, and means "man of Biśir", referring to the desert region around the Jebel Bishri. In these letters, Anson Rainey describes him as "frequently mentioned in connection with troops located near the 'Euphrates."

In one such letter, from Mut-bisir to Shamshi-Adad I, he was the first recorded individual to refer to Canaanites by name (Akkadian, ki-na-aḫ-nu(m)). In this letter, Mut-bisir describes his soldiers and opposing Canaanite forces as tensely watching one another.

His residence in Mari seems to have eventually been given to Shibti, the daughter of Shamshi-Adad I, and this household became a major supplier of foods to the royal palace.
