= Ebla–biblical controversy =

The Ebla–biblical controversy refers to the disagreements between scholars regarding a possible connection between the Syrian city of Ebla and the Bible. At the beginning of the Ebla tablets deciphering process in the 1970s, Giovanni Pettinato made claims about a connection. However, much of the initial media excitement about a supposed Eblaite connection with the Bible, based on preliminary guesses and speculations by Pettinato and others, is now widely described as "exceptional and unsubstantiated claims" and "great amounts of disinformation that leaked to the public". In Ebla studies, the focus has shifted away from comparisons with the Bible, and Ebla is now studied above all as a civilization in its own right. The tide turned after a bitter personal and scholarly conflict between the scientists involved, and an alleged interference by the Syrian authorities on political grounds.

== The controversy ==
Pettinato, in a meeting of the Society of Biblical Literature in St. Louis on October 29, 1976, said that he had identified the names of Sodom, Gomorrah, and Zoar/Bela in the Ebla tablets, locations which are known from Genesis 14 of the Hebrew Bible. He repeated this claim in a speech in December and a survey article in 1977. Alfonso Archi fiercely contested these findings in 1979 and 1981. These back-and-forth interpretations of Eblaite tablets were based on tablets whose facsimiles had not been published for others to study, and some of Pettinato's findings changed. For example, Pettinato claimed to find references to Sodom and Gomorrah, but retracted his Zoar reading. The argument raged in the Biblical Archaeology Review and amongst other scholars at the time.

=== Geographic sites ===
As some of the Eblaite inscriptions were published as early as 1978, scholars attempted to translate some of them. When tablet TM 75.G.2231 was published, it was described as the "Eblaite Geographical Atlas" (EGA) because it contained 289 locations including place names, geographical constructs like forest, valley, and river, and travel directions, like circuit. The tablet was essentially a duplicate of a text found at Abu Salabikh in Iraq, and therefore assisted in the reconstruction of the fragmented one there. For example, in 1983, William H. Shea published a study of about 80 of these place names to try to identify the ones in Palestine.

Of the sites studied from the EGA, many were classified by William Shea as "good mention", (Note: identifications the author felt were clear and likely to refer to a previously known place or had a recognizable name.) such as: Maakah (Abel Beth Maacah?), New Aphek, Ragaba, Damiyeh, Abila, Gibeon, Gibbethon, Janoah, Halhul, Admah, Sodom, Seir, and Aqabah. Both Admah and Sodom were given particular scrutiny due to the controversy surrounding the works of Pettinato concerning a different tablet. Questionable place names in the EGA included Abel-Shittim, Ashdod, Geshur, Lod, Yabneh, and Gilead, amongst many others.

The same EGA, now called the "List of Geographic Names" by more recent researchers, has been interpreted quite differently as names of places in Mesopotamia and not Palestine. For example, the same city in the list, No. 172, is said to be Beirut in the Shea article, while at least one modern scholar believes it is Abudan, locating it in modern Iraq near Abu Duwari.

=== Hebrew names and rituals ===
Many ancient Hebraic names that have not been found in other Near Eastern languages have been reported to occur in similar forms in Eblaite (Adamu, H'à-wa, Jabal, Abarama, Bilhah, Ishma-el, Isûra-el, Esau, Mika-el, Saul, David). Also among Pettinato's claims, rituals like the release of a scapegoat laden with impurities in purification rites connected with a wedding and enthronement were immediately recognized as ancient Near Eastern parallels to Hebrew practice in the first millennium, recorded in Leviticus 16. Other claims included the election of local kings, claimed to be uniquely reminiscent of practices in early Israel.

However, Ebla was a hereditary monarchy, and contrary to many earlier claims, the present consensus is that "Ebla has no bearing on the Minor Prophets, the historical accuracy of the biblical Patriarchs, Yahweh worship, or Sodom and Gomorrah".

==== Yahweh ====
Among Pettinato's controversial claims, he suggested that there was a change in the theophoric names shown in many of the tablets from -el to -ia, indicated in the example of the transition from Mika'il to Mikaya. This change is represented by the cuneiform sign NI (Sumerian: 𒉌), (Note: Cuneiform sign NI is ascribed the Unicode code point U+1224C, it is number 380 according to the sign numbers (MesZL) of Riekele Borger.) which Pettinato read as ya, he regards this as evidence for an early use of the divine name Yah, however, Pettinato does not conclude that this is the same as the Israelite God Yahweh (YHWH). Jean Bottéro has suggested that this shift may instead indicate the Akkadian god Ea (Ia).

On the other hand, both Archi (at first) and Anson Rainey, have suggested that the -ya is actually a diminutive ending used in shortened forms of personal names, while Hans-Peter Müller has argued that the cuneiform sign NI should be interpreted in this case as an abbreviation for NI-NI (Sumerian: 𒉌𒉌) and read as í-lí which mean My God, a view that Archi has since adopted with a modification, his reading of NI being íl (god). No list of gods or offerings mentions a deity by the name of Ya, and the connection with Yahweh is largely rejected today by scholars.

==== Creation myth ====
Three tablets containing almost the same text have been found. (Note: One of the tablets is TM.75.G.1682.) According to Pettinato, they describe an Eblaite creation hymn, and they have been translated by him as :

Lord of heaven and earth:
the earth was not, you created it,
the light of day was not, you created it,
the morning light you had not [yet] made exist.

These lines seem to have points in common both with known Sumerian creation stories and with the biblical account. Nevertheless, Archi objected that the original text is unclear to the point of being incomprehensible (texts from Ebla are difficult to read in general), leading him to conclude that "there is no Genesis creation story" in the documents.

== End of the controversy ==
The supposed Eblaite connections with the Bible are now widely dismissed as unsubstantiated. The studies on Ebla focus on the civilization of the city.

== See also ==
- Biblical archaeology
