= Abbar =

Abbar is a name.

People with this given name include:

- Abbar (563-562 BC), king of Tyre

People with this surname include:

- Ibn al-Abbar (1199–1260), Arab poet, diplomat, theologian and scholar
- Mohammed bin Ali Al Abbar (born 1956), a United Arab Emirates businessman
