= Hauron =

Ugaritic, Canaanite and Egyptian deity

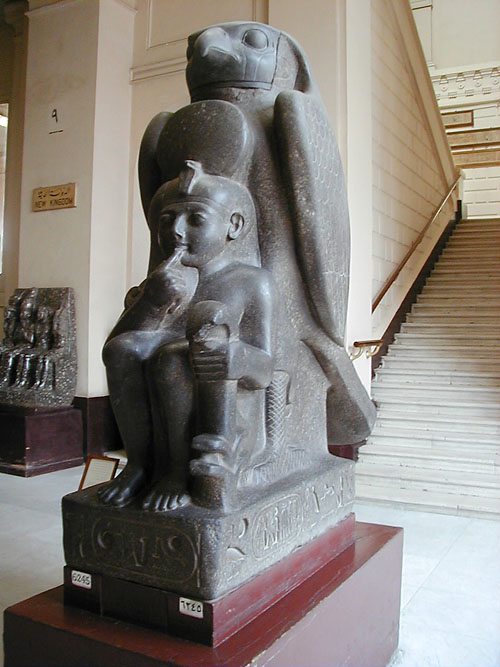
- An Egyptian statue of Hauron in the form of a falcon protecting the pharaoh Ramesses II, depicted as a child. Egyptian Museum, Cairo.
Name in hieroglyphs
V28 G43 E23 N35 A40
- Major cult center: Giza

Hauron, Horon, Haurun or Hawran (from Egyptian ḥwrwnꜣ) was an ancient Egyptian god worshiped in Giza. He was closely associated with Harmachis, with the names in some cases used interchangeably, and his name as a result could be used as a designation of the Great Sphinx of Giza. While Egyptologists were familiar with Hauron since the nineteenth century, his origin was initially unknown, and only in the 1930s it was established that he originated outside Egypt. Today it is agreed that he was the Egyptian form of a god worshiped in Canaan and further north in the city of Ugarit, conventionally referred to as Horon (Ugaritic: 𐎈𐎗𐎐, romanized: ḥrn; Ḥôrānu or Ḥōrān) in scholarship.

In the Ugaritic texts, Hauron appears as a deity associated with magic and exorcisms. This role is also attested for him in Egypt and in Phoenician sources from the first millennium BCE. The best known text focused on him is KTU 1.100, often interpreted as a myth, in which the Ugaritic sun goddess Shapash implores him to help pḥlt, a figure of unknown character troubled by snakes. He is also well attested in incantations. However, his name does not appear in any offering lists from this city, and it is assumed his importance in Ugaritic religion was minor.

In the first millennium BCE, Hauron continued to be worshiped in Egypt, but his cult also spread through the Mediterranean, and he is attested in Phoenician and Punic sources from as far west as Sardinia. In the Hebrew Bible he is referenced in toponyms such as Beth-Horon. The last source to mention him is a Greek second-century BCE inscription from Delos referring to his worship in Jamnia.

== Name ==
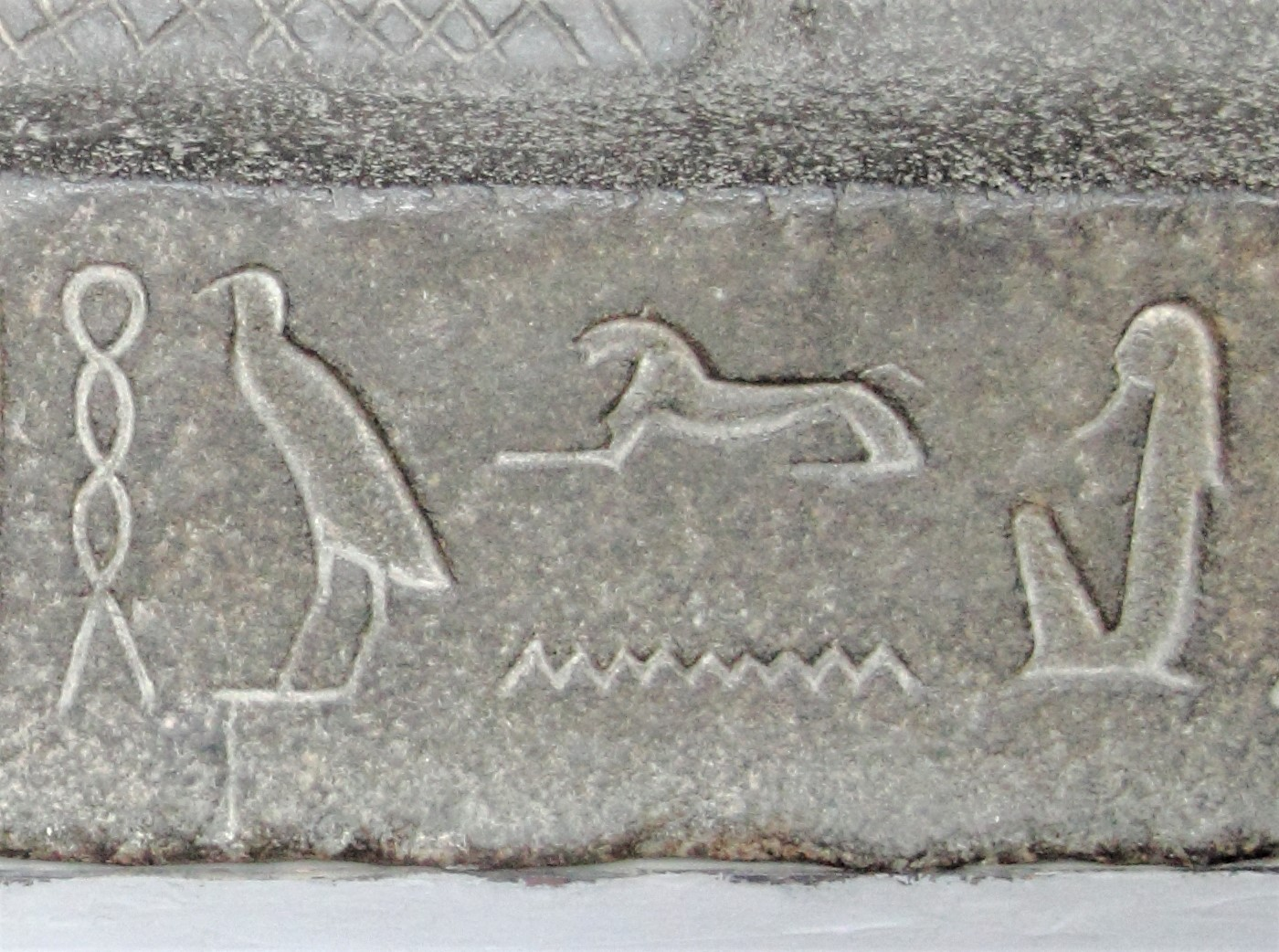
Hauron's name inscribed on a statue.

The spellings Hauron and Haurun are both in use in modern Egyptological publications. Primary sources indicate there might have been no single agreed upon orthography of the name in ancient Egyptian scribal circles. While the god was known to modern researchers since François Chabas published a translation of the Harris Magical Papyrus in 1860, only in the 1930s it became possible to establish that he originated outside Egypt. While based on the Ugaritic texts, where the theonym is rendered as ḥrn (Ugaritic: 𐎈𐎗𐎐), it should be vocalized as either Ḥôrānu or Ḥōrān, the spelling Horon, which is based on the later Phoenician form of the name, is commonly employed in scholarship pertaining to the worship of Hauron in the north. A further spelling found in literature is Hawran.

It has been proposed that the name is related the root ḥwr present in Semitic languages and that it might mean "the deep one". Similarities to the Arabic word ḥaur, referring to the bottom of a well or a broad depression, and to Hebrew ḥôr, "cave" or "hole", have been pointed out, though according to Nicolas Wyatt the fact that in Ugaritic the cognate is written ḫr rather than ḥr might cast doubts over this etymology. An alternate proposal is that the name is a cognate of Arabic ḥourroun, "falcon". The early view that it might reflect the ethnonym ḫurri (Hurrian) is no longer considered credible.

== Character ==
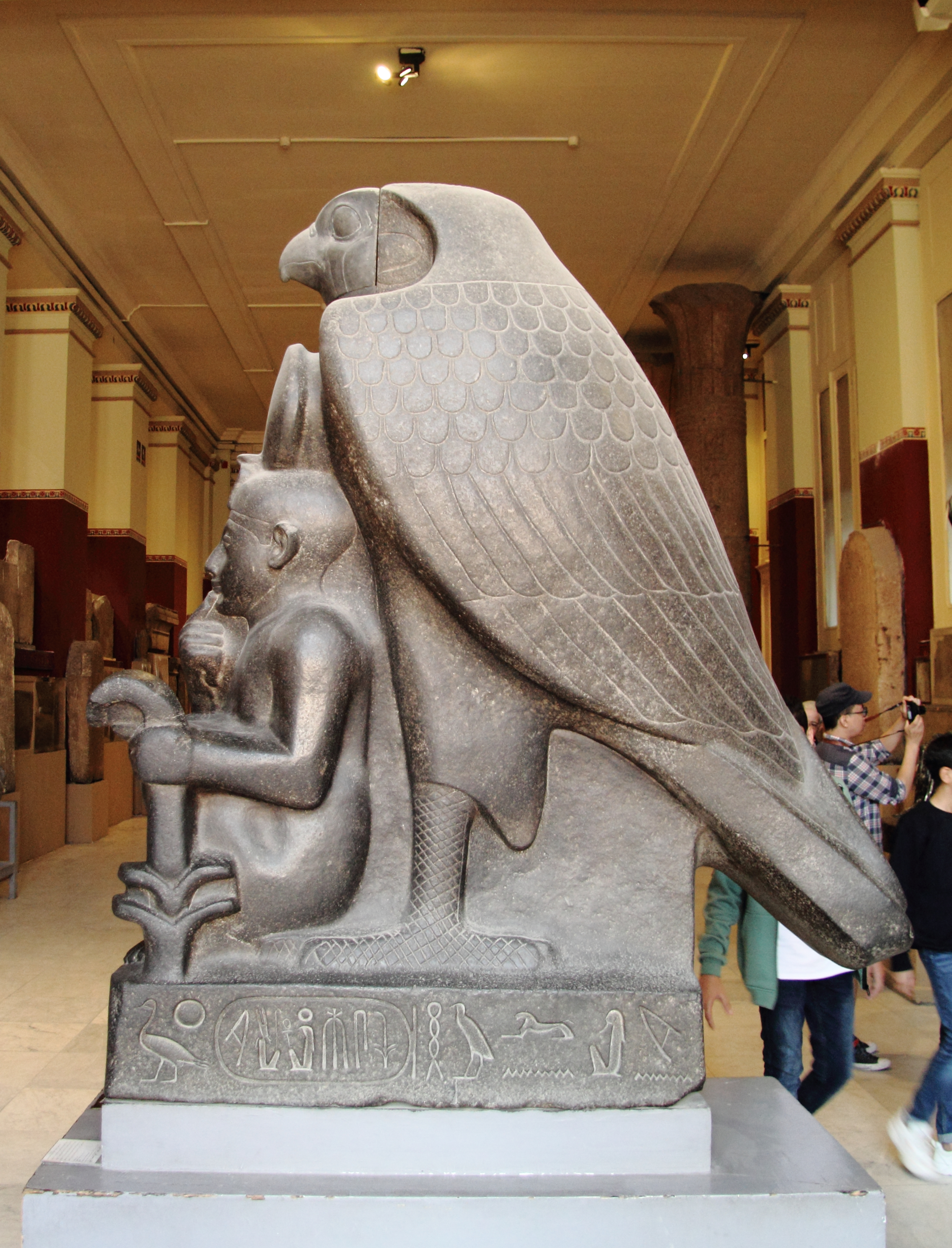
Statue of Ramesses II as child together with the falcon-shaped Hauron, 1290-1223 BCE, New Kingdom, Nineteenth Dynasty.

The main sources of information about Hauron's character are magical texts from Ugarit, Egypt, and Arslan Tash. Earliest theories about his character were formed by William F. Albright, but they have been since deemed "conjectural and speculative". The Ugaritic texts indicate that he was chiefly associated with exorcisms and magic. In a single passage, he is addressed as a ḥbr(m), most likely to be understood as a term referring to a specialist in the field of magic comparable to Mesopotamian mašmāšu or āšipu, translated into English as "spellcaster" by Aicha Rahmouni. The craftsman god Kothar-wa-Khasis could be described in a similar way. A further Ugaritic figure whose role has been compared to Hauron's is Shatiqatu, interpreted either as a minor goddess or another type of supernatural being (a "healing genie" or an entity comparable to an angel or golem) associated with exorcisms.

The Egyptian Papyrus Harris mentions Hauron in a role similar to that he plays in Ugaritic texts, invoking him to render a wolf harmless with the help of Anat and a third deity, identified as either Arsaphes or Resheph depending on the translation. Elsewhere he occurs as a healing deity. He was also invoked to protect fields, and in this capacity has been referred to as a shepherd. Richard H. Wilkinson proposes that Egyptians associated with the deserts, and considered him a god of herdsmen and other people who wandered through this environment. Jacobus van Dijk concluded that he was understood as a god of the desert capable of protecting people and livestock from the animals inhabiting it. George Hart has characterized him as an earth god.

=== Disputed aspects ===
George Hart argued that Hauron's character was ambivalent, and asserted in particular that his association with a "tree of death" in a single text he identifies as "Canaanite" designates him as a "god of doom". The term ‘ṣ mt, translated as "tree of death" or "deathly tree", is present in the Ugaritic text KTU 1.100 in a description of plants gathered by Hauron, but the passage according to Wilfred G. E. Watson should be understood as a recipe for a cure for snakebite and lists ordinary plants, though he notes the precise identification of individual names remains disputed. He does not list the "deathly tree" among the terms he considers to be the names of specific plants. Dennis Pardee argues the passage reflects use of wood in exorcisms and since one of the plants mentioned according to him is the date palm, it might indicate that Hauron was believed to travel eastwards to Mesopotamia to gather plants typical for this area. He additionally suggests this might be a nod to perception of Mesopotamian apotropaic magic as particularly efficient. Suggestions that KTU 1.100 portrays Hauron in a negative light, presenting him as the "god of black magic, master of evil demons", can also be found elsewhere in literature, but Gregorio del Olmo Lete notes that this view is "surprising" due to his portrayal as an effective helper in this composition.

It is a matter of dispute among researchers if Hauron was also associated with the underworld, with some authors, such as Nicolas Wyatt, voicing support for this assumption, while others, for example Manfred Krebernik, do not consider it to be conclusively proven. Wyatt's argument rests on the assumption that the term designating Hauron's dwelling in the Ugaritic texts, mṣd (in KTU 1.100 written as mṣdh, which is possibly a directional form, a possessive one, or both at once) refers to a location in the underworld. Similar argument has been by Udo Rüterswörden. The term mṣd is often translated as either "fortress" or "steppe", though neither possibility is regarded as certain. It also occurs in an Ugaritic ritual text pertaining to a group of deities known as Gaṯarāma (dual) or Gaṯarūma (plural), which seemingly included the moon god Yarikh, the sun goddess Shapash and the god Gaṯaru, but the context does not provide any additional hints about its meaning.

== Possible early attestations ==
It has been argued that a theophoric name from Mari, Ḫawranabi, might invoke Hauron, and therefore can be translated as "Hauron is father". While assertions that he appears in multiple names from this city can be found in literature, according to Ichiro Nakata's survey of Old Babylonian Mariote theophoric names, only a single person bearing one invoking him is attested in known documents. The Mariote name has been used as an argument for also reconstructing names of two roughly contemporary Canaanite kings attested in texts from Saqqara as theophoric names invoking Hauron, though this remains speculative.

In the past it was believed that the logogram ^{d}NIN.URTA, found in a total of four passages in the corpus of the Amarna letters, might correspond to Hauron, but this view has been challenged in 1990 by Nadav Na'aman. He points out that his character was not similar to Mesopotamian Ninurta, and additionally that he is entirely absent from theophoric names from Ugarit and other late Bronze Age sites, unlike the deity represented by this logogram. He proposed that it should be understood as a logographic representation of the name of the goddess Anat instead. This proposal subsequently found support from other researchers, including Peggy L. Day (who extends its scope to ^{d}NIN.URTA in documents from Emar as well) and Michael P. Streck (who only considers it applicable to Canaan and the kingdom of Amurru).

== Ugaritic attestations ==
It is assumed that Hauron was not a high ranking god in the local pantheon of Ugarit, and he is entirely absent from offering lists from this city. He is best attested in incantations against snakebite. One example is KTU 1.82, in which both the god himself and his nameless servants appear alongside a selection of figures presumed to have negative characters in this context, including Resheph, Mot and Tunnanu. A further text of this type is KTU 1.107, where Horon is paired with El and alongside him opens a list of deities implored to remove poison, which includes the pairs Baal and Dagan, Anat and Ashtart, Yarikh and Resheph, Attar and Attapar, Ẓiẓẓu-wa-Kāmaṯu, Shahar and Shalim, as well as Milku, Kothar-wa-Khasis and Shapash, the last three listed individually. He is also mentioned in KTU 1.169, presumed to be a compilation of various protective incantations against witchcraft. In this text, he is asked to expel various malevolent sorcerers.

=== Myths and paramythological texts ===
Horon is mentioned in the text KTU 1.100, whose genre is disputed, with individual authors classifying it as a "charm against serpents", an incantation, a myth, or a "paramythological" composition. He appears in it in association with a figure named ủm pḥl pḥlt or simply pḥlt, whose character - "divine, human or equine" - is uncertain, and who is not attested in any other Ugaritic texts. While attempts have been made to identify her as one of the principal goddesses of Ugarit (for example Athirat, by the early 2000s such proposals were no longer regarded as plausible. Gregorio del Olmo Lete assumes she should be understood as a distinct goddess, possibly one also associated with a similar sphere of activity as Hauron and thus comparable to Mesopotamian Ningirima or to Išḫara. Dennis Pardee presumes that she should be understood as "an equid whose origins are cosmological". The equine identification is also supported by Wilfred G. E. Watson and Theodore J. Lewis. Steve A. Wiggins notes that her name might be related to Akkadian terms pertaining to horses.

The text consists of a series of appeals to various deities, followed by the intervention of Hauron and a marriage proposal he makes. While snakes are mentioned by pḥlt, and it agreed that the text pertains to her trouble with these animals, there is no direct reference to a snakebite occurring. The deity who asks the other members of the Ugaritic pantheon for help on pḥlt's behalf is Shapash, the sun goddess. While pḥlt addresses her as her mother, it is not certain if this statement reflects her actual genealogy or if it simply designates her as an authority figure. The deities invoked are Baal, Dagan, Anat (paired with Ashtart), Yarikh, Resheph, Ashtart (on her own), Ẓiẓẓu-wa-Kāmaṯu, Milku, Kothar-wa-Khasis and the pair Shahar and Shalim, all of them invoked from their cult centers, some of them located close to Ugarit (Mount Saphon), other on Crete, in Anatolia (Bibitta) or Upper Mesopotamia (Tuttul, Mari). They all prove to be ineffective in this situation, and it takes the intervention of Horon to solve the problem. He uses a variety of plants he gathered, presumably to deal with venom. It is not certain if the marriage proposal is necessarily aimed at pḥlt, though this view is supported by most translators of this text, with only a minority arguing that its target is instead Shapash.

A curse invoking Hauron appears both in the Baal Cycle (KTU 1.2.1.7–8) and in the Epic of Keret (KTU 1.16.6.54–57). Most likely it was a fixed formula which was not composed specifically for these works of literature. It is similar in both cases, and can be translated as "May Hauron break (...) your head, Ashtart-Name-of-Baal your skull", though the targets are different: in the former case a deity presumed to be Baal curses his adversary, the sea god Yam, while in the latter the eponymous king curses his son Yassibu. It is not known why Ashtart is mentioned alongside Hauron in this context, and the translation of the phrase specifying her relation to Baal, tentatively translated by Theodore J. Lewis and a number of other researchers as "face", is also uncertain. In neither of these texts Horon plays any role after being invoked in a curse.

== Egyptian reception ==
Horon is one of the best attested deities of Levantine origin who came to be worshiped in ancient Egypt. It is presumed that his cult was introduced from Canaan, but more detailed reconstruction of its early development is not presently possible. His earliest cult center was Giza. The exact date of his introduction is not known, though he already appears on a stela of a certain Mes, possibly to be dated to the reign of Thutmose III, as well as on foundation tablets from the local temple of Harmachis. This would indicate that his arrival was contemporary with the introduction of other deities of similar origin, namely Resheph and Ashtart, into the local pantheon of Memphis.

Evidence for both royal and private worship of Hauron is available. However, no accounts of clergy dedicated to him or to Hauron (or Hauron-Harmachis) are available, with the exception of an isolate reference to a certain Pay, a grain measurer in his service, which is considered difficult to reconcile with the large number of available sources documenting the daily life of ancient Giza. While it is known that he did receive offerings like other deities, further features of his official cult are therefore difficult to ascertain. The limestone doors of a building from the reign of Tutankhamun located in the proximity of the Great Sphinx refer to the pharaoh as the "beloved of Hauron". Seti I dedicated a stela depicting him during a hunt and praising his military accomplishments to Hauron-Harmachis. During the reign of Ramesses II, the cult of Hauron is attested outside Giza for the first time, specifically in Deir el-Medina and possibly also in Pi-Ramesses. A reference to "Hauron of Lebanon" has been identified in the inscription on a sphinx from the Ramesside period from Tell el-Maskhuta too.

=== Associations with local deities ===
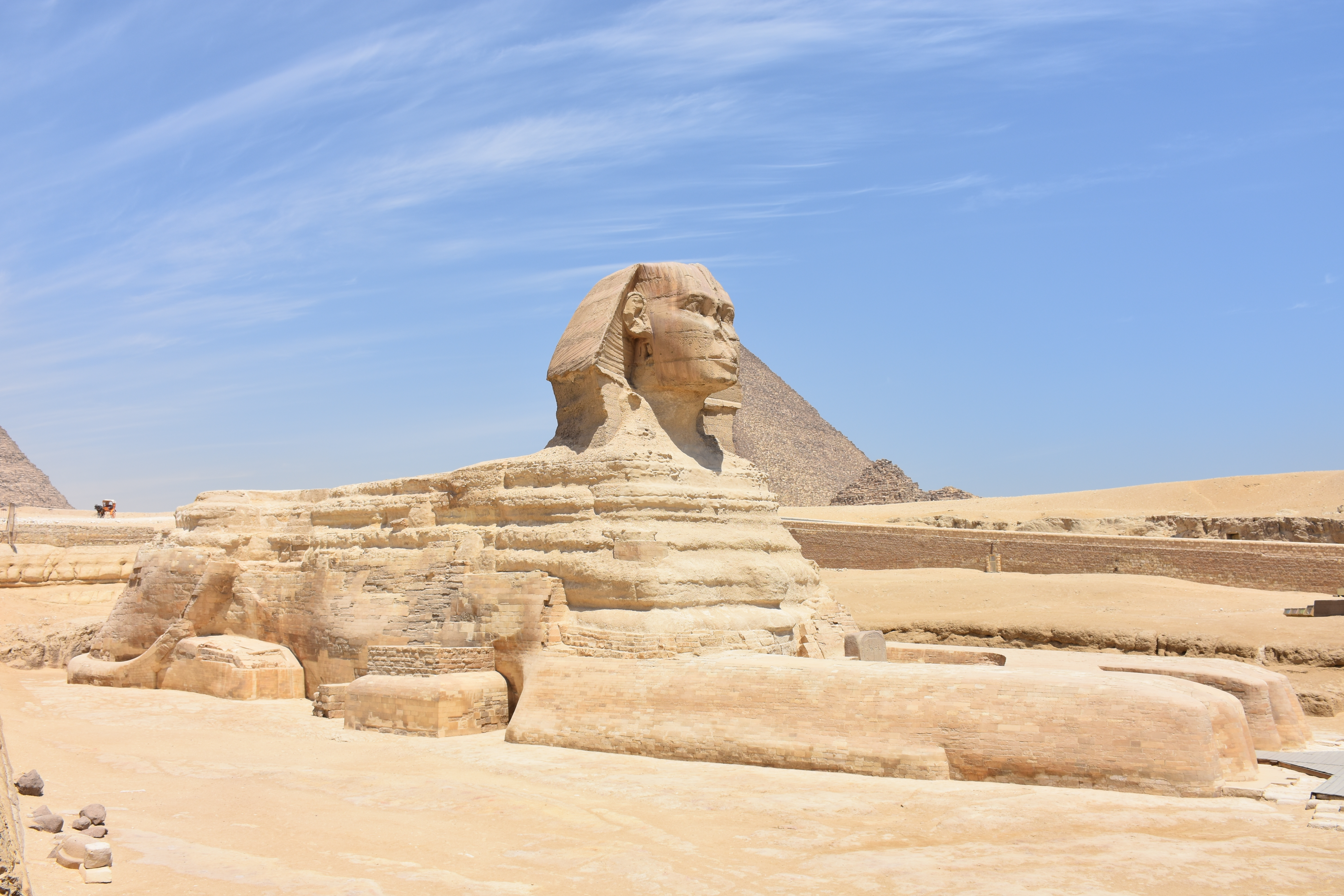
The Great Sphinx of Giza.

In Egyptian context, Hauron came to be associated with Harmachis. The modern spelling of this theonym is a hellenized form of Haremakhet, "Horus-in-the-horizon". This god was associated with the Great Sphinx of Giza, referred to with his name from the period of the New Kingdom on. The name of Hauron himself could also be used as a designation for this monument. While it was initially assumed that only foreigners referred to it by this name, Christiane Zivie-Coche argues that this view should be abandoned, as based on names of individuals mentioned in documents using this designation they were either Egyptian, or at least Egyptianized to such a degree they used Egyptian personal names and titles. Richard H. Wilkinson does consider it possible that it was initiated by workmen from outside Egypt present in the area, but he also proposes that it might be rooted in a hitherto unknown mythological connection. According to Zivie-Coche, the scope of the connection between Hauron and Harmachis was unique and it should be considered a distinct phenomenon from the other instances of adoption of northern deities in Egypt. The names Hauron, Harmachis and Hauron-Harmachis could be used interchangeably to designate the same deity. A personal prayer of a certain Kheruef uses the formula "Harmachis in his name of Hauron", and implores the god to grant him a long life, reassuring him that he will "follow [his] ka" (remain faithful). The reasons behind the partial conflation remain uncertain, as the character of Harmachis shows no apparent similarities to Hauron.

On amulets from Deir el-Medina, Hauron instead appears alongside Shed, and according to Jacobus van Dijk seemingly could be identified with him in this area, as evidenced by use of double names Hauron-Shed and Shed-Hauron.

=== Iconography ===
It was the norm in ancient Egyptian art to depict foreign deities in the same manner as native ones, with attributes reflecting their individual character and position in the pantheon rather than their origin. Hauron could be depicted either as an armed man or as a falcon, possibly due to the phonetic similarity of his name to that of Horus. This form has no forerunner in earlier iconography of any deities from the Levant. A famous example from Egypt is a statue which shows the avian Hauron protecting Ramesses II, in this case shown as a child. It is assumed that he served as one of the tutelary deities of this pharaoh. As Hauron-Harmachis he could also be depicted in various forms: while that of a sphinx was typical, a Horus-like falcon form is known too. A stela showing the latter form is presently in the collection of the Egyptian Museum in Cairo.

== First millennium BCE attestations ==
In the first millennium BCE, the worship of Hauron apparently spread across the Mediterranean. His character in the Phoenician and Punic sources resembles that described in the Ugaritic texts. Only a single Phoenician theophoric name invoking him, ‘bdḥwrn, is known. Its bearer is mentioned on a seal of unknown provenance dated to the eighth or seventh century BCE. A Phoenician amulet from Arslan Tash mentions Hauron "whose command is perfect and (...) his seven concubines, (...) the eight wives". However, it has been called into question if this object is authentic. He also appears in a Punic inscription from Antas on Sardinia dated to the sixth or fifth century BCE, which mentions that statuettes representing him and the healing god Shadrafa could be offered in the local temple of the god Sid.

In the Hebrew Bible, Hauron is mentioned in the toponym Beth-Horon (Hebrew: בֵית־חוֹרֹ֔ן; Joshua 16:3, 5), "house of Hauron". The name apparently refers to two separate settlements, both in the proximity of Jerusalem, sometimes referred to as the "upper" and "lower" Beth Horon. Beth-Horon is also mentioned in a Hebrew ostracon from Tell Qasile and in an Egyptian topographical list from the reign of Shoshenq I. It has also been proposed that a connection existed between his name and Horonaim, a city located in Moab. A further toponym which might at least be cognate with Hauron's name is Hauran.

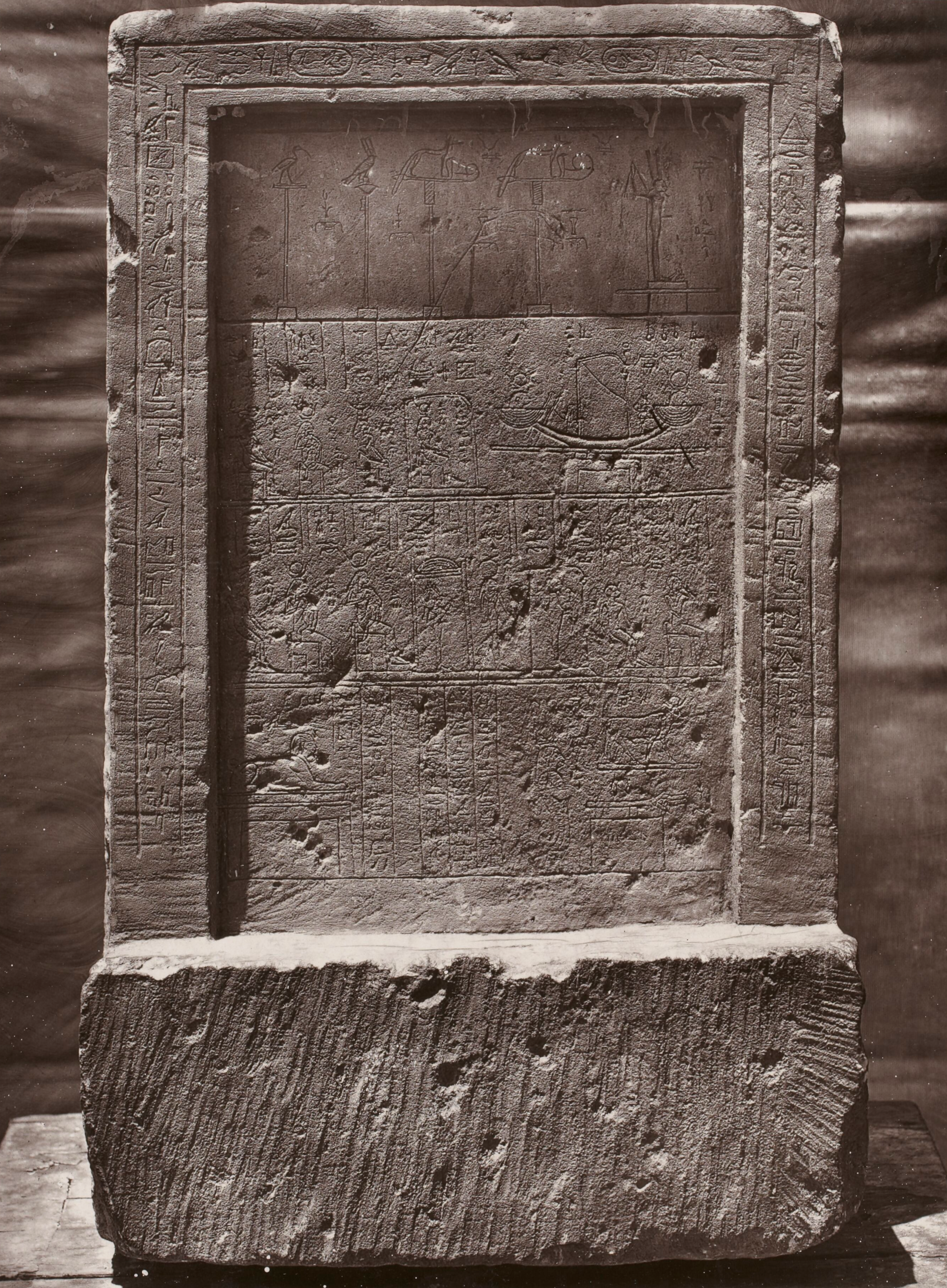
The Inventory Stela.

The worship of Hauron continued in Egypt as late as in the Saite period, though his foreign origin was no longer remembered. The so-called Inventory Stela, which despite its age mentions the Old Kingdom pharaoh Cheops, presumably because he was the first pharaoh to build his pyramid in Giza, states that a temple dedicated to Haurun was located in the proximity of the Great Sphinx of Giza, next to ones dedicated to "Isis, Mistress of the Pyramids" and "Osiris, Lord of Rasetau".

The last known reference to Hauron is a Greek inscription from Delos from the second century BCE, which refers to a deity named Auronas, and states that he was worshiped in Jamnia alongside Heracles (possibly to be understood as Melqart in this case), and that all offerings were viewed as appropriate for him except for goats. Since this city is located in the historical Philistia, the presence of Hauron in the local pantheon might indicate that the Philistines at some point incorporated Canaanite deities into their own beliefs. Brian Peckham argued that Hauron was introduced into this area by Judeans.

== See also ==
- Canaanite religion
- Horus, Egyptian deity
