= Resheph =

Eblaite, Ugaritic and Ancient Egyptian deity

- God of war and disease
- Other names: Iršappa, Rušpan (disputed)
Name in hieroglyphs
r S p w A40 or r S p W G7
- Major cult center: Ebla, Adanni, Tunip, Ugarit, Bibitta, Deir el-Medina, Idalion
- Planet: Mars
- Weapons: bow, arrow, shield
- Animals: gazelle, horse

Genealogy
- Spouse: Adamma (in Ebla); Itum (in Egypt); possibly Dadmiš (in Ugarit)

Equivalents
- Greek: Apollo, Hylates
- Mesopotamian: Nergal
- Hurrian: Nupatik
- Egyptian: Montu
- Luwian: Runtiya
- Arabian: Ruda

Resheph (also Reshef and many other variants, see below; Eblaite 𒀭𒊏𒊓𒀊, Rašap, Ugaritic: 𐎗𐎌𐎔, ršp, Egyptian ršpw, Phoenician: 𐤓𐤔𐤐, ršp, Hebrew: רֶשֶׁף Rešep̄) was a god associated with war and plague, originally worshiped in Ebla in the third millennium BCE. He was one of the main members of the local pantheon, and was worshiped in numerous hypostases, some of which were associated with other nearby settlements, such as Tunip. He was associated with the goddess Adamma, who was his spouse in Eblaite tradition. Eblaites considered him and the Mesopotamian god Nergal to be equivalents, most likely based on their shared role as war deities.

In the second millennium BCE, Resheph continued to be worshiped in various cities in Syria and beyond. He is best attested in texts from Ugarit, where he was one of the most popular deities. While well attested in ritual texts and theophoric names, he does not play a large role in Ugaritic mythology. An omen text describes him as the doorkeeper of the sun goddess, Shapash, and might identify him with the planet Mars. He was also venerated in Emar and other nearbly settlements, and appears in theophoric names as far east as Mari. The Hurrians also incorporated him into their pantheon under the name Iršappa, and considered him a god of commerce. Through their mediation, he also reached the Hittite Empire. He was also introduced to Egypt, possibly by the Hyksos, and achieved a degree of prominence there in the Ramesside period, with evidence of a domestic cult available from sites such as Deir el-Medina. The Egyptians regarded him as a warlike god, but he could also be invoked as a protective healer. He was associated with gazelles and horses, and in art appears as an armed deity armed with a bow, shield and arrows.

References to Resheph from the first millennium BCE are less common. He did not play a large role in Phoenician religion overall, with only one reference to him occurring in texts from Sidon, though he is well attested as a member of the Phoenician pantheon of Cyprus. He was also worshiped by Arameans in Cilicia and in Syria. References to him are also present in the Hebrew Bible, though due to the process of demythologization his name does not always refer to a personified deity. Greeks considered him an equivalent of Apollo, as attested by bilingual inscriptions from Cyprus, though it is not certain if this example of interpretatio graeca was recognized outside this island.

== Name ==
=== Etymology ===
The etymology of Resheph's name is uncertain. According to Michael P. Streck, it is derived from the root ršp, and its cognates include Amorite yarśap (“to flame”), an element of personal names attested in texts from the Old Babylonian period, and the nominal rišp-, “flame” or “fever”, present in Hebrew and Aramaic. This possibility is the most commonly proposed explanation in scholarship, though it did not find universal support, and Maciej M. Münnich notes that it rests on biblical evidence, which comes at most from the sixth century BCE, in contrast with the oldest attestations of Resheph, which date back to the twenty-fourth century BCE, with no sources supporting this derivation from within the nearly two thousand year period separating them. Streck, despite his support for this proposal, acknowledges the nature of the connection between the presumed meaning of Resheph's name and his character is not fully clear. A second proposal is to link his name with Akkadian rašābu(m), “to destroy”, and rašbu(m), “terrifying, horrible” This view is supported by authors such as Jean-Marie Durand, but it similarly did not find universal support. Paolo Xella notes that all of the proposed etymologies might be the result of circular reasoning, as they depend on the available information about Resheph's character.

=== Spellings ===
Cuneiform texts from Ebla render Resheph's name as Ra-sa-ap (𒊏𒊓𒀊). No further variants are attested in text from this city, and in most cases the name is preceded by the “divine determinative”, dingir (𒀭𒊏𒊓𒀊). The same spelling is also attested in sources from Mesopotamia and from Emar, though texts from this city also use variants such as Ra-ša-ap, Ra-šap and Ra-šap-pa.

In Ugarit, Resheph's name was written as ršp (𐎗𐎌𐎔) in the alphabetic script, and it is variously vocalized by Ugartiologists as Rašp, Rašap or Resheph. The writings Ra-ši-ip and Re-ša-ip appear in texts in standard syllabic cuneiform. Logographic ones are also attested, many of them derived from the various forms of the theonym Nergal: ^{d}GÌR.UNU.GAL(.LA), ^{d}MAŠ.MAŠ and ^{d}KAL (=^{d}LAMMA), though it is sometimes questioned if Resheph was necessarily meant in every case when they were used. The use of logograms originally linked to Nergal to represent Resheph is also well attested in texts from Ekalte, with identified examples including ^{d}GÌR, ^{d}IGI and ^{d}MAŠ.TAB.BA.

The Hurrian form of the name had a prothetic vowel affixed to it, resulting in spellings Aršappa and Iršappa, sometimes shortened to Iršap or Irša. The Hurrian variant is also attested in Ugarit as eršp. It has also been proposed that the variant name ^{d}Ra-sa-pa-an developed through Hurrian influence too, but this view is not universally accepted.

Two forms of the name are attested in texts from ancient Egypt, ršp and ršpw, which might indicate a change in pronunciation occurred at some point, with the former writing reflecting Rashap, Rashp or Reshp and the latter - Rashpu or Reshpu, with a final u making the name easier to pronounce for speakers of Egyptian.

=== Resheph and Rushpan ===
Maciej M. Münnich argues that the theonym Rushpan should be identified as a form of Resheph's name used in the Middle Euphrates area. A pre-Sargonic tablet from Mari mentions the offering of cereal to various deities, including ^{d}Ra-sa-pá-an. A temple dedicated to him is mentioned in Mariote texts from the reigns of Shamshi-Adad I and Yahdun-Lim. Manfred Krebernik accepts that the names were likely cognates, but does not consider it certain that the two were identical, pointing out a long tradition of using the logogram ^{d}GU_{4} (“bull”) to represent the name Rushpan, as attested in lexical lists and the god list An = Anum (tablet VI, line 206).

== Eblaite sources ==
Oldest known references to Resheph have been identified in texts from Ebla. They are dated to the period between 2450 and 2200 BCE, and spans between 30 and 40 years. Most of the available attestations of deities in it come from economic texts, which makes it impossible to fully study the character of Resheph in Eblaite religion as other types of sources, such as myths or descriptions of specific ceremonies, are lacking. It is nonetheless possible to determine he was one of the main deities of the local pantheon. While not equally commonly attested as Hadabal and Kura, he is one of the most frequently mentioned deities in the entire Eblaite text corpus. His individual functions are difficult to clarify. While he was not directly invoked in association with combat, it is nonetheless presumed that he was regarded as a warlike deity due to a large number of weapons listed among offerings he received, including 15 daggers, 11 axes, 4 lances and 2 or more clubs. Alfonso Archi states that the club offering, during which the god also received four bull horns, was an annual rite.

=== Worship ===
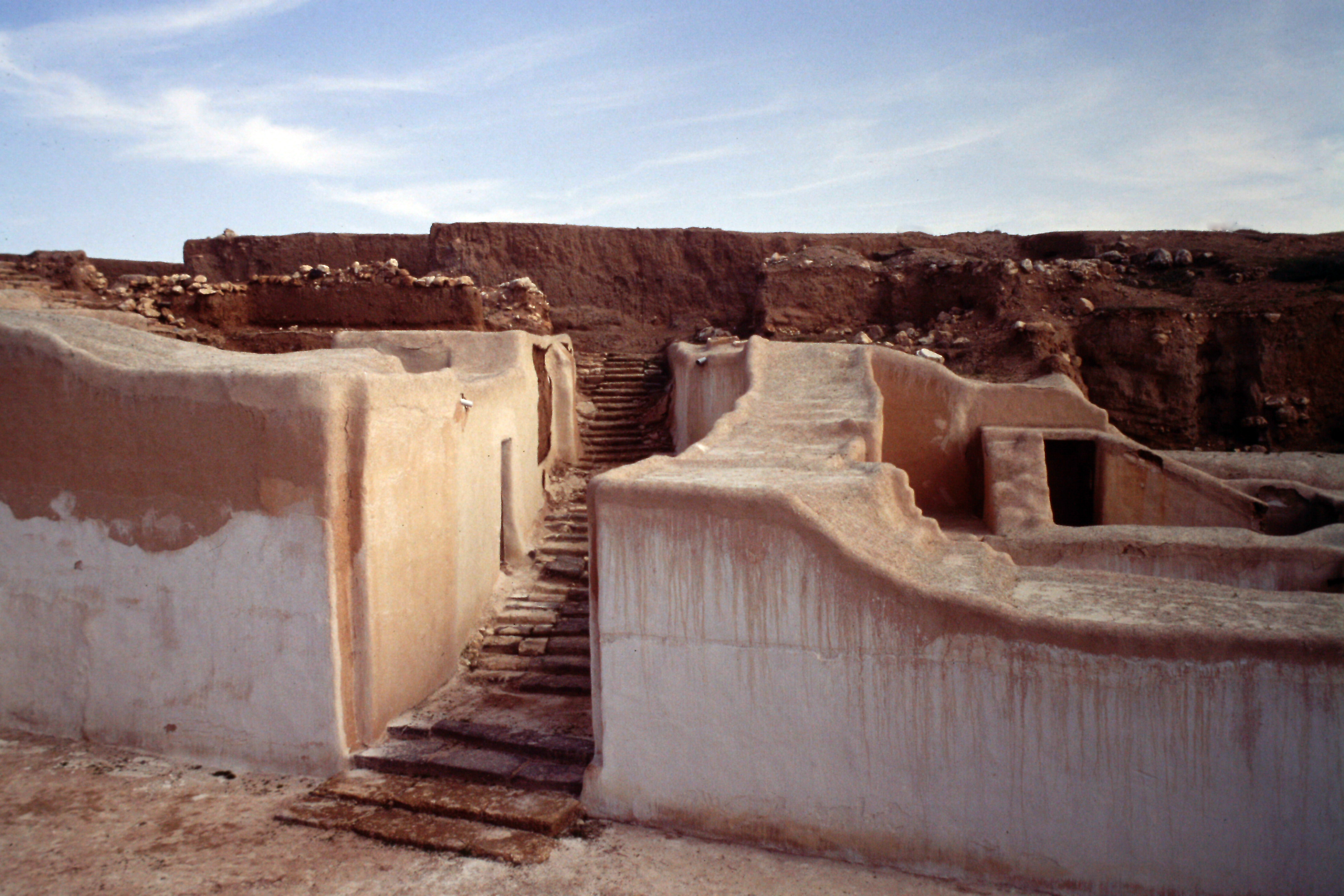
The royal palace in Ebla.

In Ebla Resheph was venerated both by common citizens and the royal family. Reference to two priests in his service, Re’i-Malik and Ennai, are also known. Furthermore, foreign kings visiting Ebla also made offerings to him, as indicated by records of sacrificial sheep provided by the royal palace for such occasions.

One of the city gates of Ebla was named after Resheph. His two main cult centers in its proximity were seemingly Adanni and Tunip, both of which were relatively small settlements. Alfonso Archi notes that an association with an otherwise insignificant city or cities is a characteristic shared by him with a number of the other major deities of Ebla, namely Dagan (from Tuttul), Hadda (from Halab) and Hadabal (from Hamadu, Larugadu and Luban), and that it can be assumed in the third millennium BCE none of them owed their popularity to the political influence of their cult centers. However, despite its proximity to Ebla, Resheph is entirely absent from the text corpus from Tell Beydar.

Multiple hypostases of Resheph are attested in Ebla. Most frequently mentioned is the form of this god linked to Adanni. Resheph of gunum is the second most commonly referenced. The precise meaning of this term is a matter of debate, complicated by the fact it is attested almost exclusively in association with Resheph and, much less frequently, with closely linked Adamma. It can be literally translated as “garden”, but it has been suggested it was used to refer to the royal cemetery. However, no texts from Ebla mention Resheph in a funerary context. Maciej M. Münnich suggests that gunum might have been a palatial enclosure for animals, as the associated hypostasis of Resheph received wool as offering particularly often, and references to a bull linked to his cult are known. Resheph of Tunip is also attested, chiefly as a recipient of silver. This hypostasis seemingly had no chapel in the city of Ebla itself, and local dignitaries traveled to venerate him. The royal palace hill (sa-za_{x}^{ki}) also had a form of Resheph associated with it, "Resheph of the palace", though it has been proposed this title referred to Resheph of Adanni worshiped in a chapel located there rather than to a fully separate hypostasis. Further forms, associated with Daraum (an administrative center of the Eblaite state), Shi’amu, ‘Adatu, Shamutu, Muriku, Armi, Nei, Sarrap and Shaku, are also attested, but they are mentioned less frequently, with most only occurring once. The large number of hypostases is presumed to reflect Resheph's popularity.

Theophoric names invoking Resheph are uncommon in the Eblaite text corpus, which Michael P. Streck explains as a result of his possibly negative characteristics. However, this assumption has been criticized by Maciej M. Münnich, as the attested examples, such as Yitin-Rasap ("Resheph gave") and ‘Ebdu-Rasap ("servant of Resheph"), do not appear to hint as such a perception.

=== Associations with other deities ===
Resheph typically received offerings either alongside other major members of the local pantheon, such as Hadabal, or alongside the goddess Adamma. The latter was regarded as his spouse, though the connection between them is seemingly limited to the early tradition of Ebla. They were also worshiped together in Tunip. Resheph also appears commonly alongside the sun deity, represented by the Sumerogram ^{d}UTU, though usually regarded as a goddess. He is also attested in association with the Eblaite form of Ea, Hayya. In one case, they occur as a dyad and receive a single jewel as an offering together.

The text VE 806 indicates that Resheph and the Mesopotamian god Nergal were locally regarded as equivalents. This correspondence most likely depended on their shared warlike character. Despite this connection, no writing of Nergal's name was used to represent Resheph in Ebla. Wilfred G. Lambert has noted that a name of Nergal found in a later Mesopotamian god list, ^{d}LUGAL-ra-sa-ap (𒀭𒈗𒊏𒊓𒀊; with the Sumerogram LUGAL possibly standing for an unidentified West Semitic noun rather than lugal or šarrum), “lord Resheph”, uses the spelling of Resheph's name typical for Eblaite and Old Akkadian texts from the third millennium BCE.

=== Other third millennium BCE attestations ===
Sporadic instances of Resheph appearing as a theophoric element in Akkadian personal names have been identified, with one example being Iṣī-Raśap. As pointed out by Maciej M. Münnich, while found in a text from Susa in Elam, this name most likely belonged to a person hailing from a part of Syria conquered by Sargon of Akkad, rather than to a local inhabitant. It is therefore not possible to speak of an active cult of Resheph in this area. A single theophoric name invoking Resheph, Rašap-ilī, has also been identified in an Old Assyrian text, and it is presumed he was the family deity of its bearer. However, Resheph is not otherwise attested in this role in known Old Assyrian sources and Rašap-ilī might have not been an Assyrian himself, as he is only mentioned a document describing business deals in Talhat, a city in Upper Mesopotamia. Klaas R. Veenhof in his discussion of this isolated attestation notes Resheph's well attested prominence in northern Syria.

== Second millennium BCE sources ==
Resheph continued to be worshiped in the second millennium BCE, and remained a popular deity in a number of areas bordering on the Mediterranean Sea.

=== Ugaritic texts ===
The corpus of Ugaritic texts has been described as “one of the most abundant collections of data concerning Resheph”. It has been proposed that he arose to prominence in this city in the late Bronze Age. He was associated with both plague and war. He was also connected to the underworld.

==== Associations with other deities ====
Ugaritic and Akkadian god lists from Ugarit indicate that the theological view that Resheph and Nergal were analogous to each other was also accepted in this city.

Some evidence exists for an association between Resheph and Ashtart reflecting their shared features, though it is not extensive.

In the standard Ugaritic lists of deities, Resheph follows “auxiliary gods of Baal” (Ugaritic: il t‘ḏr b‘l) and precedes Dadmiš. Manfred Krebernik suggests that she might have been linked to Resheph in some way, possibly as his spouse, and additionally points out her name might be related to the Mesopotamian goddess Tadmuštum, who was associated with the underworld. Nicolas Wyatt argues that based on their placement in lists it can be assumed that they were counted among Baal's divine helpers, but Dennis Pardee maintains that there is no evidence in favor of viewing either of them as closely linked to the weather god.

==== Worship ====
The offering list corresponding to the standard deity lists assigns a ram to Resheph as a sacrifice, similarly as to most of the other deities mentioned. In another offering list, he follows Shapash, the sun goddess. Yet another similar text places him after Tiraṯu (a deity representing young wine) and before a hypostasis of Anat, designated by the term ḫbly. He received an ewe as a burnt sacrifice in this case. He also appears in a ritual which took place in Ra’šu-Yêni, “first of the wine”, the last month in the Ugaritic lunar calendar, seemingly on the roof of the temple of El, where shrines were set up for various deities in presence of the king. In this case, he received an ewe as a burnt offering, after a similar sacrifice made to Ṯukamuna-wa-Šunama, and later separately a ram as a “peace offering”. RS 19.013, a tablet describing one of the so-called “contemplation rituals” whose form and function remain uncertain, also involves Resheph. He is additionally mentioned alongside various other deities in a short prayer for well-being, which according to Dennis Pardee might list gods viewed as the sons of El. Furthermore, the only among the many votive objects found in Ugarit to be identified by an accompanying inscription as an offering to a specific deity is a drinking vessel shaped like a lion's head, which a certain Nūrānu dedicated to "Resheph-guni" (ršp gn). Pardee assumes that the second element of the name is a toponym, Gunu, according to him a city located somewhere in Syria, though it has also been suggested that this term refers to the royal necropolis in Ugarit, and that it might be related to Eblaite gunnum.

A dual or plural form of Resheph's name, ršpm, is also attested in ritual texts. Sacrifices to this group of deities took place in the royal palace. Manfred Krebernik presumes it can be connected to his various hypostases attested in Ugaritic texts, such as ršp idrm (meaning unknown), ršp bbt (“Resheph of Bibitta”), ršp mhbn (“Resheph of Mōhāban”), ršp mlk (“ Resheph of Mulukku”), ršp ṣbi (“Resheph of the army”) and ršp ḥgb (possibly “Resheph of locusts”).

Eighty seven inhabitants of Ugarit bearing theophoric names invoking Resheph have been identified in known texts, with four of them being scribes. This makes him the third most common of the deities attested in this context, with El and Baal being more popular and Shapash and Teshub appearing with comparable frequency. The element ḥgb also appears in theophoric names on its own, with twenty five individual examples known, and Wilfred H. van Soldt proposed interpreting it as an attribute of Resheph in this context.

==== Mythology ====
Despite being frequently mentioned in ritual texts and theophoric names, Resheph does not play a large role in Ugaritic mythology. In the Epic of Keret, he is responsible for “carrying off” the fifth wife of the eponymous king. The term used has a broad meaning and the exact way in which she died cannot be established. Mark S. Smith has also proposed that Habayu, who in the literary text KTU 1.114 attacks drunk El and smears him with excrement, might be another name of Resheph.

In the text Horon and the Mare, Resheph is invoked from Bibitta, a city in Anatolia. He is asked to remove poison alongside many other deities. A thematically similar text dealing with removal of serpent venom focused on Shapash invokes him alongside Yarikh in a sequence of pairs of deities, after El and Horon, Baal and Dagan, and Anat and Ashtart.

==== Divination ====
In an omen text, RS 12.061, Resheph is addressed as the doorkeeper of the sun goddess Shapash. According to Dennis Pardee, it can be assumed that he functioned as an underworld deity, and that he was responsible for opening the gates of the underworld to let her undertake the nightly portion of her journey. However, the text is likely an allusion to an astronomical phenomenon as well. While attempts have been made to identify it as a report of a solar eclipse, according to Pardee it describes a period of five days during which the planet Mars, corresponding to Resheph, has been observed at sundown, before its heliacal setting made that impossible on the sixth day. Maciej M. Münnich notes that based on Mesopotamian evidence it is possible that Mars was regarded as an ill omen in Ugarit.

RS 24.247+, an Ugaritic omen compendium which deals with teratomancy (telling the future based on observation of malformed animal fetuses) in a manner similar to Akkadian Šumma Izbu, states that an animal born with short legs foretells a situation in which “Resheph will consume the progeny”.

=== Other Syrian sources ===
Many theophoric names invoking Resheph have been identified in texts from Emar. Examples include Ikūr-Rašap (Akkadian: “Resheph has proven to be reliable”), Rašap-kabar (Amorite: “Resheph is great”), Rašap-lā’ī (Amorite: “Resheph is powerful”), as well as names where the theonym is abbreviated, such as Iddin-ra (Akkadian: “Resheph has given”) and Yakūn-ra (Amorite: “Resheph has proven to be reliable”). Overall he is the third most frequently invoked deity in them, after Dagan and Adad.

It is sometimes assumed that Resheph is not directly attested in ritual texts from Emar. However, Ian Rutherford assumes that the deity referred to as “Nergal of the market (KI.LAM)” or “lord of the market” might be Resheph, which would indicate the name is to be read as Rašap/bel mahiri; a connection to trade is not otherwise known for Nergal, but is well attested for Resheph in Hurrian tradition. This identification is also accepted by John Tracy Thames, who notes the epithet presumably reflected his importance in the eyes of a specific section of society, similarly as other titles derived from names of professions. He also proposes that the deity only mentioned under the epithet “Lord of Šagma” in texts from this city might be either Resheph or Erra. Gary Beckman tentatively considers interpreting the city god of Emar, represented by the Sumerogram ^{d}NIN.URTA, as Resheph, but he notes caution is advised, and points out Joan Goodnick Westenholz instead suggested that ^{d}NIN.URTA in Emar designated a strictly local deity, known as Il Imarī or possibly Ḫamari, “the Emariote god”. It is also sometimes proposed that the deity ^{d}U.GUR, who appears alongside Shuwala in a description of a festival, might be Resheph, though this logogram might also be read phonetically as Ugur (a possibility supported by Hurrian sources from the site) or as Nergal.

In addition to the evidence from Emar, Resheph is also attested in texts from Azû and Ekalte. All three of these sites are located in the proximity of each other, and were culturally similar. Amorite theophoric names invoking Resheph have also been identified in texts from Mari and from the Ḫana. However, in the former only seven examples are attested. The proposal that some Mariote attestations of Nergal in personal names and elsewhere should be understood as references to Resheph are regarded as baseless. There is also no evidence that he was ever actively worshiped further south in Mesopotamia.

=== Hurrian reception ===
Like a number of other deities originally worshiped in Ebla, such as Adamma, Aštabi, Ḫepat and Ishara, Resheph was incorporated into the Hurrian pantheon, as attested in texts from Ugarit, Emar and Alalakh. He was regarded as the tutelary god of the marketplace in Hurrian religion. He was referred to as damkarrassi, “of commerce”, a loanword derived from Sumerian DAM.GÀR. He belonged to the circle of deities associated with Teshub, and in standard offering lists (kaluti) he typically appears between Ḫešui and Tenu.

Three theophoric names invoking the Hurrian form of Resheph have been identified in the Ugaritic texts. One example is Tagi-Irshappa, “Irshappa is beautiful”. In Alalakh, the evidence for the worship of Resheph is limited to two certain and four dubious theophoric names, with both of the former, Irshappa (either an abbreviation or a personal name identical with the Hurrian variant of the theonym) and Irshapi-andi, being Hurrian.

Manfred Krebernik has suggested that the fact that in a single Ugaritic text Resheph is invoked from Bibitta, elsewhere described as a cult center of the Hurrian god Nupatik, might indicate that he was locally equated with that god. The existence of a connection between them is also accepted by Maciej M. Münnich. Aicha Rahmouni notes that an epithet of Nupatik attested in Hittite sources, ^{d}LAMMA KI.KAL.BAD, “Nupatik of the army”, is semantically a parallel of Resheph's Ugaritic title, “Resheph of the army”.

The Hurrian form of Resheph was among the deities incorporated into the Hittite pantheon in Samuha and the Hittite capital Hattusa under the influence of Hurrian religion. The evidence for the association between Resheph and trade is also present in Hittite texts, for example a festival tied to the cults of Samuha refers to him with the epithet damkarrassi.

=== Egyptian reception ===
The Egyptian data pertaining to the worship of Resheph is considered difficult to collect and analyze due to being largely limited to dispersed royal and private monuments. He most likely was already known in Egypt during the reign of the Thirteenth Dynasty. He might have been originally introduced by the Hyksos. The oldest available evidence for his presence in Egypt is the theophoric name of a brewer originating in Syria or Canaan, ‘Apra-Reshpu, who lived during the reign of Sobekhotep III. First direct references to the worship of Resheph occur during the reign of Amenhotep II (1425 - 1399 BCE), similarly as in the case of a number of other northern deities, such as Hauron and Astarte. The pharaoh himself mentions him on a stele found in the proximity of the Great Sphinx of Giza, and in an inscription from a temple of Amun in Karnak. In another inscription he describes himself crossing the Orontes River in a manner comparable to Resheph, which is presumably meant to highlight his courage and mark him as a great warrior.

==== Character ====
Egyptians regarded Resheph primarily as a warlike god. This aspect of his character is well attested in royal inscriptions. Especially commonly, he appears in association with horseback or chariot warfare. A different side of Resheph is portrayed in private dedications, where he is never invoked in association with combat, and instead functions as a benevolent deity capable of securing the petitioner's health and welfare. He was depicted as an armed warrior on accompanying images, but in this context these attributes most likely had an apotropaic purpose and reflected his protective qualities and his ability to overcome demons. Akha, believed to cause abdominal pain, was considered his enemy. In the Chester Beaty papyrus, which enumerates deities protecting specific body parts from poison, depending on translation Resheph is responsible either for bone marrow, uterus, a part of male genitals, or an unidentified body part.

Relatively few epithets were assigned to Resheph in Egyptian sources and the most common of them, “great god” (20 occurrences identified as of 2013) was not exclusive to him and does not highlight any of his individual traits. He was also referred to as “hearer of prayer”, “healer” and “giver of health”, which reflects his association with healing.

==== Iconography ====
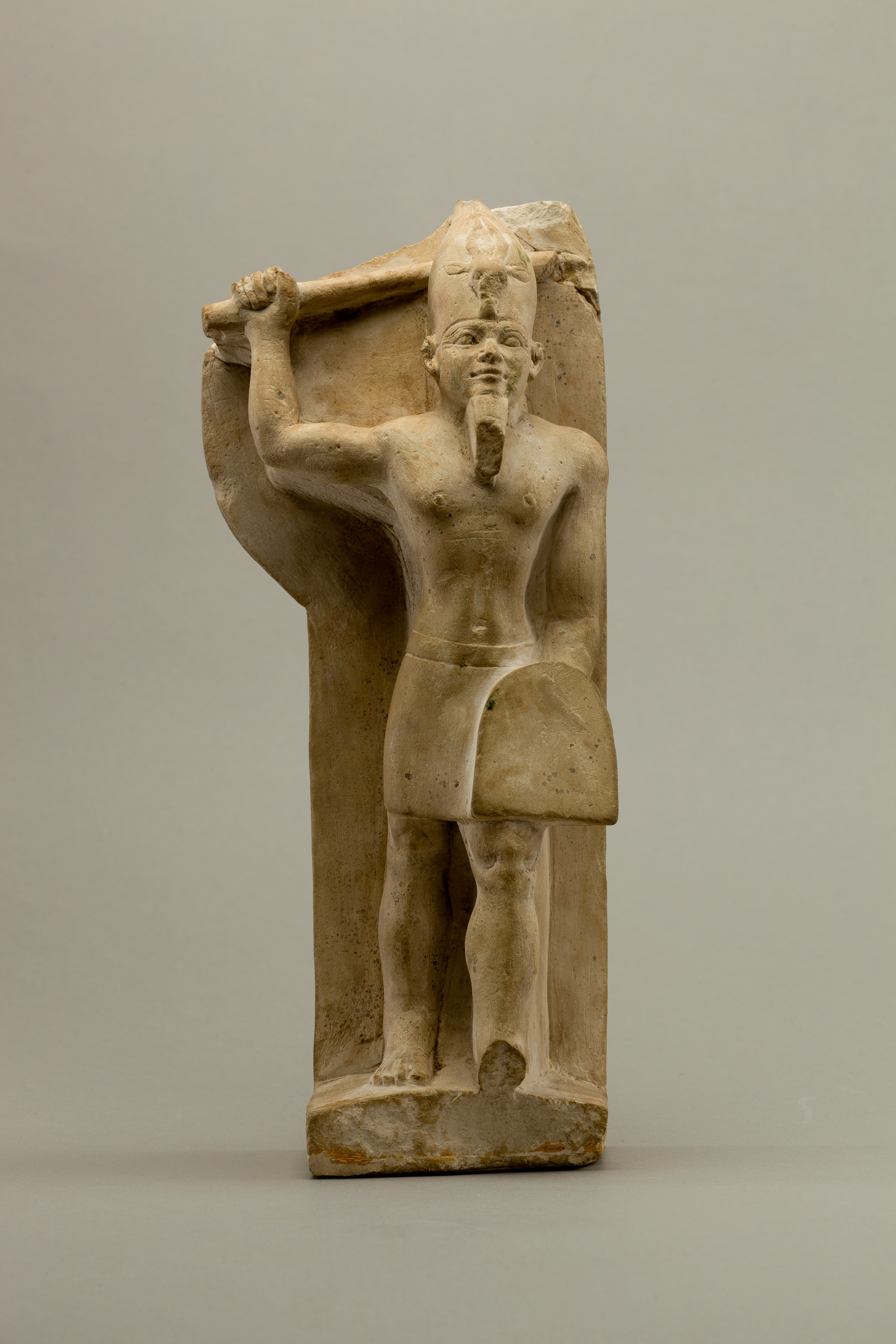
An Egyptian depiction of Resheph as a "menacing god" brandishing a weapon and holding a shield. Metropolitan Museum of Art.

Christiane Zivie-Coche notes that as in the case of other foreign deities incorporated into the Egyptian pantheon, Resheph's Egyptian iconography was primarily meant to illustrate his functions, rather than his place of origin. However, it has been argued that the kilt with tassels he was usually depicted in marked him as a foreign deity. He was often portrayed as a so-called “menacing god”, with one arm raised above head and brandishing a weapon. His attributes include a shield, a bow and arrows. Despite his character, he was never depicted attacking enemies, and seemingly art highlighted his protective aspect. Sometimes a lute could serve as one of his symbols. One example of a stele depicting him with this instrument on his back, presumed to originate in Hurbeit, has been identified in the collection of the Roemer- und Pelizaeus-Museum Hildesheim.

Resheph could be depicted either with a fake beard similar to those known from depictions of Osiris, or with a thick natural beard typical for depictions of foreigners. In the latter case he could also be shown with long hair. One of the inscriptions identified on objects originating in Deir el-Medina states that he had a “beautiful face”.

For uncertain reasons, the gazelle was associated with Resheph in Egypt. However, the connection with this animal was not exclusive to him, as it also served as a symbol of Shed. The iconography of these two gods is however otherwise “totally different”. A gazelle head could be depicted on Resheph's white crown in place of an uraeus, though in some cases the latter decoration is attested too. In a single case similar headwear dedicated with a gazelle has been assigned to the god Keserty, who according to Izak Cornelius should be identified as Kothar-wa-Khasis rather than Resheph. An association between Resheph and horses is also attested, and presumably reflected his military prowess. Depictions of Resheph as a charioteer or horseman might represent an exclusively Egyptian tradition.

==== Associations with other deities ====
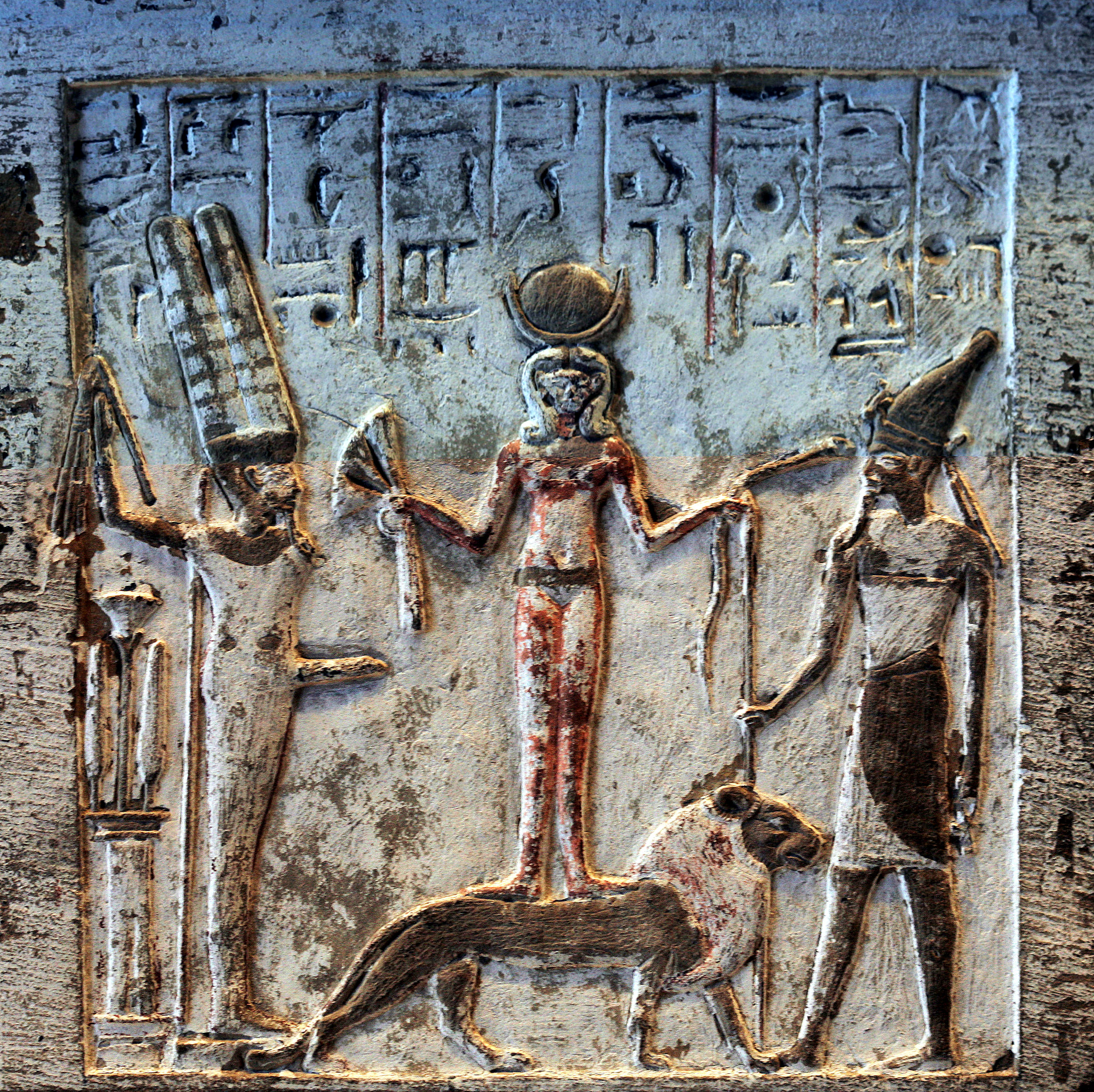
Egyptian limestone stele depicting Qetesh standing on a lion and wearing the headdress of Hathor, flanked by Min (left) and Resheph (right)

Due to his warlike character, Resheph could be associated with Montu and Set. One of the reliefs from the temple of Amun in Karnak from the reign of Amenhotep II directly refers to “Montu-Resheph”. It has been suggested that Resheph was also identified with Heryshaf. An inscription from Byblos dated to the period between 1900 and 1600 BCE which mentions the latter deity has been interpreted as an example of his name being used to refer to Resheph, though this proposal is regarded as unlikely. No certain attestations of Resheph have been identified in sources from this city. It has also been noted that in Egypt, Resheph and Herishef could be mentioned together without necessarily being identified.

Multiple references to Resheph being worshiped as a member of a triad which also included Min and Qadesh are known. These three deities are depicted for example on the stele of Ramose. In this context, Resheph was seemingly primarily invoked as a protective deity of specific individuals.

The Leiden Magical Papyrus, dated to the Ramesside Period, mentions a deity identified as the wife of Resheph, Itum, but while attempts have been made to connect her with Eblaite Adamma or less plausibly with the toponym Edom, her identity remains uncertain.

==== Worship ====
Excavations revealed evidence of veneration of Resheph in Deir el-Medina. Many of his worshipers living in this area were workers, though there is no indication that most of them were foreigners, as Egyptian names predominate. A total of twelve steles inscribed with his name have been discovered at this site. They belonged to the sphere of domestic cult, and based on their size it is assumed that they were originally held in household shrines, presumably with tables for offerings placed in front of them. In 2006, a stele depicting Resheph and Astarte was also discovered in Tell el-Borg. It is presumed that it dates to the reign of Amenhotep II or earlier. It was erected by an overseer of horses, Betu, whose name is not common in Egyptian sources and might have Hurrian origin. The inscription refers to Resheph with the otherwise unknown epithet, “lord of the estate of the stable of horses”. Presumably it was meant to highlight the devotee's close link to him.

According to Richard H. Wilkinson, a temple dedicated to Resheph existed in Memphis. Izak Cornelius instead interprets the available evidence as an indication that he was venerated within a sanctuary located in the temple of Ptah.

The worship of Resheph is also attested in Nubia, possibly as a result of religious policies of Amenhotep II. A stele from Wadi es-Sebua, while discovered in a historically Nubian area, was dedicated to Resheph by a certain Mati-Ba’al, presumed to be a merchant traveling through this area rather than a local inhabitant.

== First millennium BCE sources ==
Resheph continued to be worshiped in the first millennium BCE. However, references to him are much less frequent than in the preceding millennia.

=== Phoenician sources ===
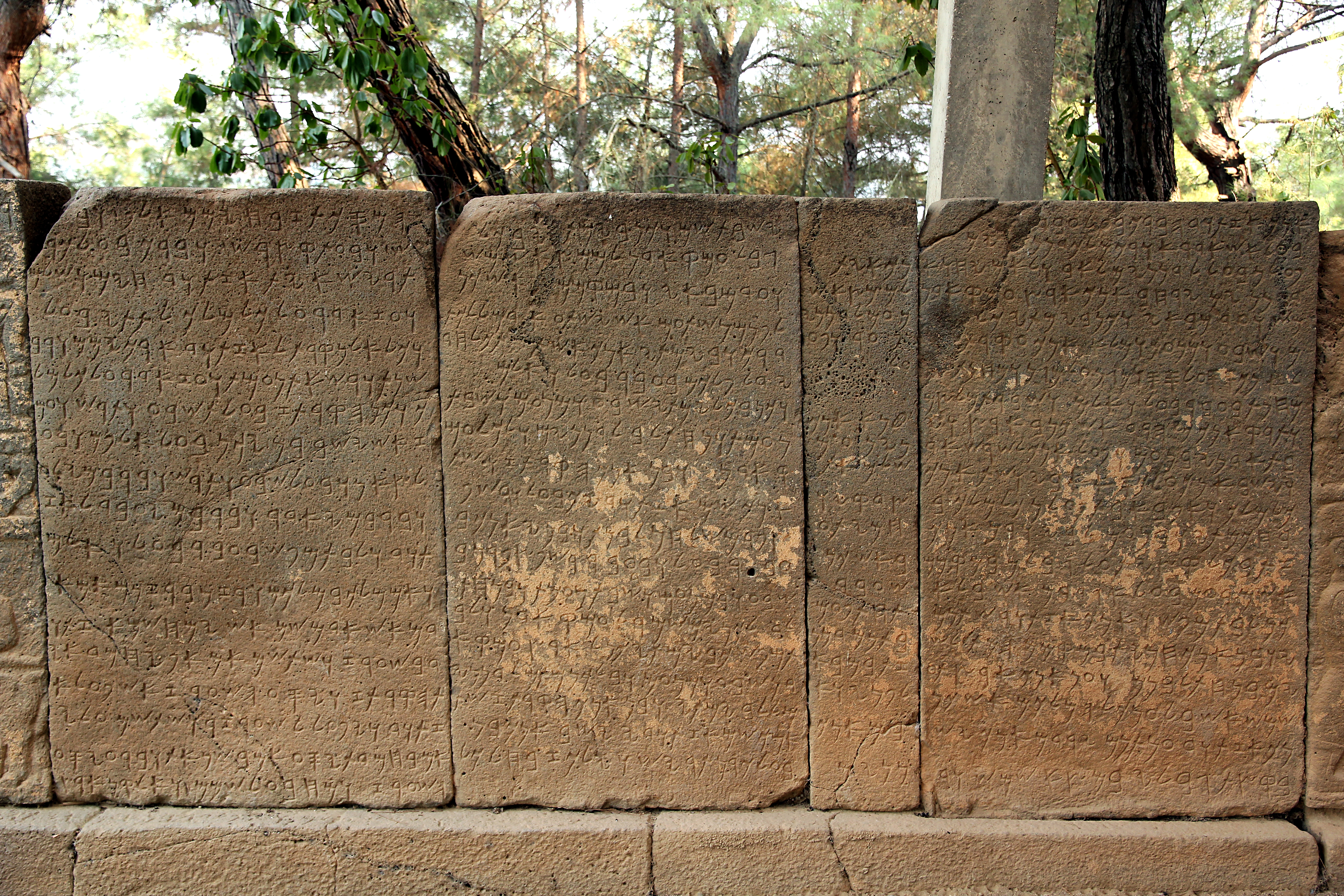
The Karatepe bilingual.

References to the worship of Resheph in Phoenician cities are scarce, and he did not play a significant role in Phoenician religion. Attestations are largely limited to toponyms and onomastics. No references to offerings, statues or altars are known, and even the Phoenician theophoric names invoking him are uncommon and exclusively attested in sources from Egypt, which might indicate they were only used by members of the diaspora. The oldest Phoenician text mentioning Resheph, the Karatepe bilingual, comes from outside Phoenicia. It is attributed to the local Cilician ruler Azatiwada. While it references Resheph, due to absence of theophoric names invoking him it is not certain to what capacity he was actively worshiped by the Phoenician inhabitants of this area, and his presence might rely on the need to include a god possible to treat as an equivalent of Luwian Runtiya. He is designated by a unique epithet in this context, șprm, possibly “of the goats” or “of the stags”. Translators most commonly presume that the title is a cognate of Hebrew ṣāpîr, with additional support for the view that an animal is meant coming from the fact that Runtiya is typically described as a “stag god” and from to Resheph's well attested association with gazelles in Egyptian sources.

Only a single source mentioning Resheph comes from Phoenicia itself. An inscription of king Bodashtart from Sidon mentions a district named after him. However, it is possible that this toponym was not linked to an active cult, and only constituted a relic of past practices. A number of difficult to precisely date Phoenician sculptures from the eighth or seventh century BCE from locations such as Gadir, Huelva, Selinous and Samos are sometimes interpreted as representations of Resheph, though Melqart is a possibile identification as well.

No evidence for the worship of Resheph in Punic cities exists. A single text mentions a person bearing a theophoric name invoking him, a certain Abd-Rashap, though the individual in mention originated in Egypt. Most of the references to purported Punic evidence for the worship of Resheph in older scholarly literature are the result of misreading the theonym Eresh (‘rš), well attested in theophoric names, or the title “Baal of the cape” (rš).

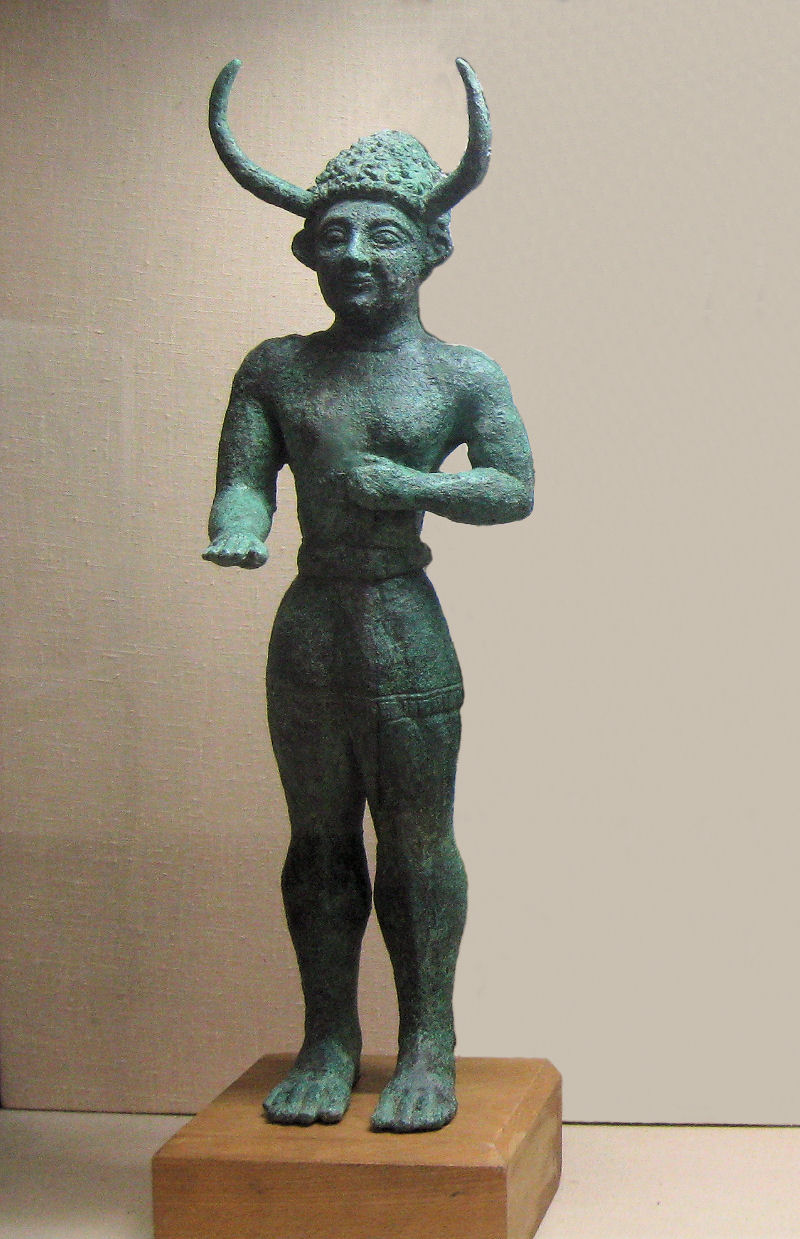
The horned god from Enkomi.

Cyprus is an exception from the scarcity of Phoenician attestations of Resheph. Sources from this area are the richest corpus of texts mentioning him from the first millennium BCE. Similarly as the evidence for the worship of Anat from this area this might indicate a continuity of traditions originating in the Bronze Age, when both of these deities were most commonly venerated. The oldest possible reference to Resheph being known to Cypriots is one of the Amarna letters, written by the king of Alashiya, in which the “hand” of a deity represented in cuneiform by the logogram ^{d}MAŠ.MAŠ, most likely him rather than Nergal in this context, is blamed for the death of local coppersmiths. This is presumed to be the description of a plague which struck the kingdom. It has also been proposed that an early bronze statue of a horned god from Enkomi might be a representation of Resheph. Later on Resheph's cult center on the island was Idalion. Four dedications to him from the reign of a local ruler, Milkyaton, have been found in this city. A bilingual inscription from Kition dated to 341 BCE mentions Resheph under the epithet ḥṣ, whose interpretation remains uncertain, with proposals such as “arrow” (hēs) or “street” (hūs) being present in scholarship. The former view is more common, and finds support in his iconography. Despite Resheph's prominence on Cyprus, the number of theophoric names invoking him from this area is small.

=== Aramaic sources ===
In the eighth and seventh centuries, Resheph was worshiped in Cilicia. However, the evidence is limited to two inscriptions. One of them is Aramaic, and has been attributed to Panamuwa I of Samʼal. He is mentioned alongside Hadad, El, Rakib-El and Shamash, the main deities of the local pantheon. However, he is absent from a similar text on a monument set up by Bar Rakib for his father. His absence might indicate that in the former case he should only be interpreted as a personal protective deity of the king.

Resheph is also mentioned alongside Kubaba on an Aramaic stela from Tell Sifr, a site located near Aleppo, but due to the state of its preservation it provides little information about his position in the local pantheon and his relation to the aforementioned goddess, though according to Maciej M. Münnich it does make it possible to establish that locally he must have been worshiped by members of high strata of society, capable of commissioning such monuments. Two Aramaic texts from Palmyra mention Resheph, in both cases alongside two goddesses, Ḥirta and Nanaya; he is also attested in the Greek version of one of them alongside Hera and Artemis.

Aramaic sources do not appear to treat Resheph as a deity of disease, and instead stress his protective character, which might have been the reason behind his association with the Arabian god Ruda, “well disposed”, possibly brought northwards by migrating Aramean tribes from the Syrian Desert. Another possibility is that this portrayal of Resheph was influenced by Ruda in the first place.

=== Hebrew Bible ===
References to Resheph are present in the Hebrew Bible, though compared to deities such as Baal he is not mentioned frequently. It is assumed that before the Babylonian Exile, Resheph might have been regarded as a minor deity inflicting diseases on behalf of Yahweh, while by the time of the compilation of the Book of Chronicles, in the fourth or third century BCE, he was no longer worshiped by the Hebrews. Eventually his name came to be understood as a common noun. In Biblical Hebrew, resheph רֶשֶׁף means "flame, firebolt", derived from שָׂרַף "to burn". Individual biblical passages show varying degrees of demythologization, therefore the name is not always used to refer to a personified figure, and sometimes serves only as a poetic metaphor. Echoes of Resheph's role as a god of plague have been identified in Deuteronomy 32:24 and Psalm 78:48. In both cases, he is represented as a tool of divine wrath. He is also mentioned in Habakkuk 3:5, according to Theodore Hiebert as a personified figure acting as the attendant of Yahweh (Eloah), though most contemporary translations treat the name as a common noun in this case. He is paired in this context with Deber, presumably also originally a personified deity. The passage most likely reflects the image of Yahweh as a great god accompanied by an entourage of lesser deities, similar to examples known from Ugaritic and Mesopotamian literature, such as the reference to Adad's servants Shullat and Hanish in the Epic of Gilgamesh. In the Job 5:7, there is mention of the "sons of resheph", translated in the Septuagint as νεοσσοὶ δὲ γυπὸς, "the young of the vulture".

Only one theophoric name invoking Resheph has been identified in the Bible, specifically in 1 Chronicles 7:25, where an individual named Resheph is mentioned as a son of Ephraim. While uncommon, the use of a theonym itself as a theophoric name is not unparalleled.

=== Greco-Roman reception ===
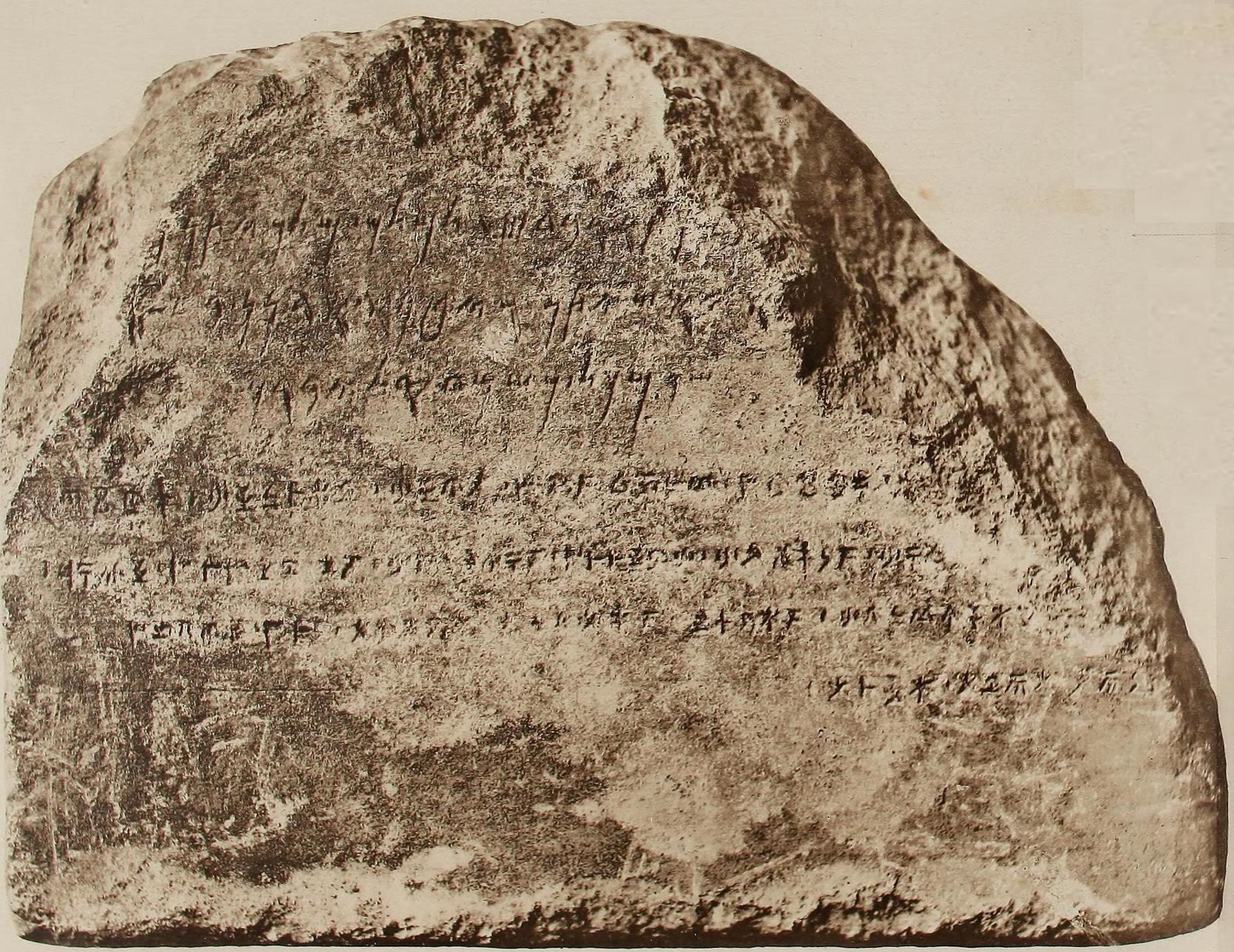
The Idalion bilingual.

The form of Resheph worshiped on Cyprus was identified with Apollo by the Greeks. The Idalion bilingual refers to “Resheph Mikal” (Phoenician: 𐤓𐤔𐤐 𐤌𐤊𐤋) in Phoenician and Apollo Amyklos in Cypro-syllabic Greek, but it is not certain if a Greek epithet was adopted by Phoenicians or a Phoenician one by Greeks. There is no evidence of this equation extending beyond said island, though Paolo Xella argues that Pausanias' mention of Apollo as the father of the Phoenician god Eshmun might be an account of a tradition which originally involved Resheph instead. The association between Resheph and Apollo relied on their shared portrayal as archers, affinity with diseases, and apotropaic functions. Javier Teixidor in particular stressed the parallels between Resheph as a plague god who strikes his victims with arrows as attested in an inscription from Idalion with the Homeric portrayal of Apollo (Iliad I.42-55). A local Cypriot deity, Hylates, might have been identified with Resheph as well.

In the Greco-Roman period Resheph apparently ceased to be worshiped in Egypt, with the only references to him including a dedication of Ptolemy III Euergetes from Karnak, litanies listing many deities from Papyrus of Imuthes and Tebtunis Papyrus, unlikely to reflect widespread personal cult, and possibly a small number of theophoric names whose restoration is a matter of dispute among researchers.

It has been proposed that Arsippus, who is mentioned in the third book of Cicero's De Natura Deorum alongside Astronoe (an ordinary Persian name, here possibly a corruption of Damaskios’ Astronoe) as the father of one of the multiple deities named Aesculapius, can be interpreted as a Latiniziation of Resheph. However, this view is not universally accepted.
