= Shadrafa =

Canaanite (Punic) god of healing or medicine

- Healing or Medicine
- Major cult center: Amrit, Palmyra, Carthage, Leptis Magna
- Symbol: Youth with a serpent or a scorpion

Shadrafa (or Shadrapa, šdrpʾ, šdrbʾ, σατραπας, i.e. "satrap") is a poorly-attested Canaanite (Punic) god of healing or medicine.

His cult is attested in the Roman era (c. 1st to 3rd centuries) in Amrit and Palmyra in the Levant and in Carthage and Leptis Magna in Africa. He is sometimes depicted as a youth with a serpent or a scorpion. In a Punic-Latin bilingual in Leptis Magna he is identified with Liber-Dionysus. Various scholarly suggestions have Palmyran šdrpʾ to Heracles, Asclepios, Eshmun, Adonis, Nergol, Melqart and Resheph. It seems probable that Shadrafa arises from Hellenistic-Canaanite syncretism, and may represent an interpretatio punica of a Hellenistic deity.
