= Legend of Keret =

Ugaritic epic poem

The Legend of Keret, also known as the Epic of Kirta, is an ancient Ugaritic epic poem, dated to Late Bronze Age, circa 1500 – 1200 BCE. It recounts the myth of King Kirta of Hubur. It is one of the Ugaritic texts.

In the legend, Kirta (Keret) is the son of the great god El but is considered unfortunate. He has been widowed seven times, and has no surviving children. He has survived all of his brothers, and he is the last surviving member of his family. He begs his father for an heir of his own, and El instructs him to wage war against another kingdom and to demand its princess as his wife. Kirta wins his war and has several children by his new wife. But he angers the goddess Athirat by reneging on a promise to her, and is cursed with an illness. El intervenes to heal his son. Kirta is then challenged for the throne by his oldest son, who wants him to abdicate in his favor. Kirta curses his son, but the ending of the story has been lost.

The story is thought to have similarities with the legend of Helen of Troy in the Iliad. It is also thought to be similar to the relationship between Yahweh/El and Abraham in the Book of Genesis. In particular, the blessing by the god himself, the promise of a son to a childless man, and the divine assistance in a military expedition.

== History ==
The epic story of Keret is contained in three rectangular clay tablets, excavated by a team of French archaeologists in Ras Shamra, Syria in 1930–31. The text is written in the Ugaritic alphabet, a cuneiform abjad. (While this script looks superficially similar to Mesopotamian cuneiform, there is no direct relationship between them.) Not all of the tablets recovered were well-preserved and some of the tablets, containing the ending of the story, appeared to be missing. The tablets were inscribed by Ilimilku, a high priest who was also the scribe for the Myth of Baal-Aliyan (a part of the Baal cycle) and the Tale of Aqhat, two other famous Ugaritic epic poems discovered at Ras Shamra.

The initial French translation of the tablets was published by a French archaeologist Charles Virolleaud, in a 1936 monograph and then in the journal Syria. A substantial number of other translations, in many languages, appeared afterwards. Among them the translations of Ginsberg (1946) and Herdner (1963) are widely used. Some of the more modern translations include Gordon (1977), Gibson (1978), Coogan (1978), and Greenstein (1997).

The Keret tablets are held at the Musée National d'Alep, Syria.

== Story of Kirta described in the tablets ==
King Kirta of Hubur, despite being reputed to be a son of the great god El himself, was struck with many misfortunes. Although Kirta had seven wives, they all either died in childbirth or of various diseases or deserted him, and Kirta had no surviving children. While his mother had eight sons, Kirta was the only one to survive and he had no family members to succeed him and saw his dynasty in ruin.

Kirta prayed and lamented his plight. In his sleep, the god El appeared to Kirta, who begged him for an heir. El told Kirta that he should make war against the kingdom of Udum and demand that the daughter of King Pubala of Udum be given to him as a wife, refusing offers of silver and gold as a price of peace.

Kirta followed El's advice and set out for Udum with a great army. Along the way he stopped at a shrine of Athirat, the goddess of the sea, and prayed to her, promising to give her a great tribute in gold and silver if his mission succeeded.

Kirta then lay siege to Udum and eventually prevailed and forced King Pubala to give his daughter (in some translations, granddaughter), Hariya, to him in marriage. Kirta and Hariya were married and had two sons and six daughters. However, Kirta reneged on his promise to the goddess Athirat to pay her a gold and silver tribute after his marriage.

(At this point there is a break in the story due to damage to the tablets. When the story resumes, Kirta's children are grown.)

Athirat grew angry at Kirta's broken promise and struck him with a deadly illness. Kirta's family wept and prayed for him. His youngest son, Elhu, complained that a man, who was said to be the son of the great god El himself, should not be allowed to die. Kirta asked for only his daughter, Tatmanat, whose passion was the strongest, to pray to the gods for him. As Tatmanat prayed and wailed, the land first grew dry and barren but eventually was watered by a great rain.

At the time the gods were debating Kirta's fate. Upon learning of Kirta's broken promise to Athirat, El took Kirta's side and said that Kirta's vow was unreasonable and that Kirta should not be held to it. El then asked if any of the other gods could cure Kirta, but none were willing to do so. Then El performed some divine magic himself and created a winged woman, Shatiqatu, with the power to heal Kirta. Shatiqatu cooled Kirta's fever and cured him of his sickness. In two days, Kirta recovered and resumed his throne.

Then Yassub, Kirta's oldest son, approached Kirta and accused him of being lazy and unworthy of the throne and demanded that Kirta abdicate. Kirta grew angry and cast a terrible curse on Yassub, asking Horonu, the master of demons, to smash Yassub's skull.

At this point the story breaks and the ending of the text appears to be missing. While the end of the legend is unknown, many scholars assume that afterwards Kirta lost all of his children, except for one daughter, who became his sole heir.

== Study and interpretation ==
Since its discovery in early 1930s, the Legend of Keret has been the subject of active scholarly study and gave rise to a wide variety of (often conflicting) analogies and interpretations. Most scholars agree that Keret is a purely mythical figure, although it is possible that some individual aspects of the myth do have historical basis. Cyrus H. Gordon argued, "It anticipates the Helen-of-Troy motif in the Iliad and Genesis, thus bridging the gap between the two literatures." Apart from the scholarly research in ancient literary traditions, the epic of Keret is frequently discussed in biblical studies and in the study of history of religion. Cross has drawn a parallel between this legend (and the Legend of Aqhat) and various incidents in the story of Abraham: like Keret, Abraham is blessed by Yahweh/El Genesis 12:1–3, receives a vision promising a son Genesis 15:1–5 and is assisted in a military expedition Genesis 14:13–29.

== See also ==
- Ugarit
- Ancient Semitic religion
- Canaanite religion
- Translation
- Poetry
- Kirta
