= Shapshu =

Canaanite solar deity

Shapshu _{or} Shamshu
- Goddess of the Sun, Messenger of El
- Planet: Sun
- Gender: female
- Parents: El (father)?

Shapshu (Ugaritic: 𐎌𐎔𐎌 špš, "sun"), also called Shapsh or Shamshu, was a Canaanite sun goddess. She also served as the royal messenger of the high god El, her probable father. (Note: See Anat's address to Shapshu in KTU 1.6 iv 10; ḥtkk 'father, sire' may be being used here in the honorific sense. See Rahmouni, 2007 pg 369) Her most common epithets in the Ugaritic corpus are nrt ỉlm špš ("Shapshu, lamp of the gods", also translated as "torch" or "luminary" of the gods by various authors), rbt špš ("great lady Shapshu"), and špš ʿlm ("eternal Shapshu"). In the pantheon lists KTU 1.118 and 1.148, Shapshu is equated with the Akkadian ^{d}šamaš.

== Name ==
The original name of the goddess contained the consonant /m/, and this consonant appears in some of the Amorite theophoric names mentioning the goddess. In the Middle Bronze Age Alalah, a process of devoicing and denasalization of the consonant /m/ made it, as a result, a /p/; this process is only attested at Middle Bronze Age Alalaḫ and at Late Bronze Age Ugarit. While name in Alalah show a mixture of the forms (Shamshu and Shapshu), in Ugarit there is not one attestation, syllabic or alphabetic, to the form "Shamshu".

There is one attestation, from Alalah, of the form "Shamash" for the name of the Amorite solar deity.

== Cult ==
Unlike Shamash or Utu in Mesopotamia, but like Shams in Arabia, Shapshu was a female solar deity. In addition to attestations in Ugaritic texts, Amarna letter EA 323 uses the Sumerogram for the sun deity, ^{d}UTU, as a feminine noun (ša ti-ra-am ^{d}UTU, line 19); given the letter's provenance with Yidya of Ashkelon it may refer to Shapshu. Similarly, the letter EA 155 from Abimilki of Tyre to the Pharaoh includes a feminine ^{d}UTU (LUGAL ^{d}UTU darītum, lines 6, 44). Old Akkadian names such as Tulid-Šamši (Šamaš-gave-(me-)birth) (Note: From Ur III tablet that can be viewed at CDLI P416456) and Umma-Šamaš (Šamaš-is-my-mother) might indicate a female sun goddess tradition in 3rd millennium BCE Mesopotamia, derived from a Northwest Semitic solar goddess.

=== In Bronze Age Levant and Mesopotamia ===
A pair of solar deities were worshipped at Ebla, whose names were written using Sumerograms: ^{d}UTU and his consort ^{d}UTU.SAL. The native Eblaite names for these deities remain unknown, though the Iron Age Aramaic Sefire steles refer to the consort of Samaš as Nur(u) ("luminary"), possibly corresponding to nrt ỉlm špš, the most common epithet of Shapshu. No theophoric names referring to Shapshu are known from Ebla; the individual whose name was translated by Pettinato as Ibbi-Sipish is now considered to be translated more accurately as Ibbi-Zikir, with Zikir being a deity unknown outside of theophoric names.

Shamshu (or Shapshu in the area of Alalah) was the Amorite solar deity.

Some names in the Execration texts mention Shamshu, not necessarily as a female deity ("š-m-šw ì-p-ì-ìrì-m" (*šamšu-ʾab(u)-ʾilim) - Šamšu is father of the gods; "š-m-šu ìri-m" (*šamšu-ʾilima) - Šamšu is god).

While at least one deity is known under the Sumerogram ^{d}UTU at Emar, their native name, gender, and affiliations to other Syrian deities remain unclear.

=== In Ugarit ===
Shapshu was a major deity in Ugaritic religion. In a letter to the king of Ugarit (KTU 2.42), Shapshu (as špš ʿlm) is named second in a formulaic list of deities, behind only Baal. Evidence from offering lists suggests that Shapshu was one of the principal gods receiving sacrifices at Ugarit. She is given the divine epithet pgr, relating to her role during the 'night of Šapšu pgr wṯrmnm' (Shapshu, the 'funerary offering', and the 'sovereigns'), and she receives a series of offerings during the ceremony of royal accession in KTU 1.161. She is also known from divinatory-oracular (KTU 1.78) and magical texts (e.g. KTU 1.100).

Theophoric names relating to Shapshu are numerous at Ugarit, including 66 individual names; the Hurrian sun deity Šimige also appears nine times. Her name is the fourth most common seen in personal names, behind the names of Baal, El, and Resheph.

Shapshu is not known to have a consort in the Ugaritic corpus, but the figure of ủm.pḥl.pḥlt in the incantation text KTU 1.100 addresses her as ủmh, ("mother").

Several incantation texts are known to invoke Shapshu. In the incantation KTU 1.100, a character referred to as 'the mother of the stallion and the mare' (ủm.pḥl.pḥlt) calls to Shapshu (her 'mother', though this may be meant in an honorific sense) for assistance in a matter relating to snakebite, as her children are apparently in danger. Shapshu acts as an arbitrator between the mother and the gods, visiting ten different deities in their dwellings until arriving at the fortress of the god Ḥoranu, who is the first to take any action in response. Ḥoranu then gathers various plants and is able to defeat the serpents and prevent the death of the mother's offspring; the incantation ends with a marriage between Ḥoranu and the mother, apparently on the condition that he share this magical knowledge with her. Writing on the edge of the tablet describes this as a 'spell against the bite of a snake'. In KTU 1.82, another incantation against snakebite, Shapshu is one of three benign gods (along with Baal and Anat) invoked to protect the victim from the depredations of Tunnan, Resheph, Mot, various serpents, and the creatures of Ḥoranu. A further incantation invoking Shapshu is KTU 1.107, where she and Ḥoranu appear early in the text. She inquires after a boy who has been bitten by a snake and the speaker calls upon her to remove the venom.

The 17th-15th century BCE cylinder seal AO 20138 (Note: Musée de Louvre: https://collections.louvre.fr/en/ark:/53355/cl010144854) depicts a female deity radiating wave-like solar rays, thought to be either Shapshu or the Hittite Sun goddess of Arinna. Azize favours an identification of the figure as Shapshu due to the absence of the Sun Goddess of Arinna's characteristic headgear and the presence of two mountain peaks he interprets as the twin peaks of Mount Sapan.

=== In Iron Age Phoenicia ===
The sun deity in Iron Age Phoenicia is consistently called šmš (Phoenician: 𐤔𐤌𐤔), rather than špš, and is attested in both male and female forms. A seventh century BCE Phoenician bowl from the Etruscan Bernadini tomb at Palestrina and the 'Phoenician Ivory of Shapash' both depict a female sun deity, though the sun cult at Baalbek centred on a male deity. Azize suggests that cultural influence from Mesopotamia or the Greek cult of Helios may have led to identification of the deity as male.

Funerary inscriptions such as the 6th century BCE Sarcophagus of Eshmunazar II make reference to tḥt šmš, "life under the sun", interpreted as referring to ephemeral life on the Earth, but also an eternal sun (šmš ʿlm, recalling the epithet špš ʿlm) as on the Shipitbaal inscription from Byblos, a symbol of eternity and the relation between the living and the dead.

A month named zbḥ šmš ("sacrifice for the sun/Šmš") is attested at 5th/6th century BCE Pyrgi in Latium, 300 BCE Kition, and 3rd century BCE Larnakas tis Lapithou in Cyprus. In one of the Phoenician texts at Pyrgi, line 4-5 reads '[Thebarie Velanus, king of Kisry] in the month of the sacrifice of the Sun, as a gift to her temple...'.

In the second century CE, Pausanias reports a conversation with a Sidonian in Aegium who referred to the sun as Apollo, and described them as being the father and sole parent of Asklepios while contrasting Greek and Phoenician notions of the gods.

== In Myth ==
The first appearance of Shapshu in the Baal Cycle is in KTU 1.2 iii, where she brings Aṯtar the news of Yam's accession to the kingship by the will of El, and may warn him of the possible consequences if he opposes El's decision and attempts to claim the throne for himself. Page interprets her role in this scene as that of a voice of moderation who successfully prevents conflict between Aṯtar and Yam.

Later in the Epic, KTU 1.4 viii 21-27, Baal instructs his emissaries to travel to deliver a message to Mot in the netherworld by joining Shapshu on her journey there. Here, she is shown to act as a bridge between the worlds of the living and the dead.

After Anat discovers Baal's body in KTU 1.6 i 8-18, she begins to weep, at which point Shapshu helps Anat lift his body onto her shoulder so that she can carry it to Mount Sapan for burial. Shapshu's assistance to Anat here may reflect her compassionate personality or may be a result of Anat finding his body at the entrance to the underworld, (Note: See KTU 1.6 ii 20, šd [šḥl] mmt, 'field [of the shore] of Mot's realm (?)' as discussed in Wiggins, 1996 pg 332) a location which Shapshu travels through on her daily journey. Anat may even ask Shapshu to burn bright ('išḫn) in order to illuminate the underworld while they retrieve Baal's corpse.

In KTU 1.6 column iii, El rejoices at his dream that Baal is still alive. Through Anat, he commands Shapshu to search for the god. When Baal and Mot are locked in their final confrontation in column vi, neither is able to gain the upper hand over the other. Shapshu intervenes, warning Mot that El has designated Baal as monarch. Mot is so frightened at the idea of going against the will of El or offending Shapshu (Note: See Wyatt, 2002 pg 143 note 117 for the latter interpretation) that he concedes the kingship to Baal, ending the conflict. The final lines of the Epic, KTU 1.6 iv 45-54, consist of a hymn to Shapshu. In this hymn, the gods and the rpum (suggested to be a group of semi-divine ancestral figures) are 'under' Shapshu, likely referring to their position beneath the sun when Shapshu is illuminating the living world and the underworld respectively.

The closing lines (49-54) of the hymn suggest an association with the deity Kothar-wa-Khasis, but translations of the nature of this association vary wildly between authors. Many older translations include lines such as 'Kôṯaru, your companion', but Wyatt translates 'Kothar-and-Hasis, steer (the bark)! Pilot (the ship), Kothar-and-Hasis!', presuming the existence of a solar barque, and Rahmouni prefers 'Kôṯaru, your spellcaster/And Ḫasīsu, your expert (in magic)'. Coogan and Smith's translation is close to that of Rahmouni: 'Kothar is your magician, and Hasis your diviner'.

== In the Bible ==
The word שֶׁ֣מֶשׁ (shemesh) is one of a few dual-gendered words in Hebrew, appearing in the Old Testament as both a masculine (e.g. in Genesis 19:23) and, less frequently, feminine (e.g. Judges 19:14) noun. Malachi 4:2 uses the imagery of the שֶׁ֣מֶשׁ צְדָקָ֔ה (shemesh sedaqah, "sun of righteousness", fem.) on the event of God's Epiphany, and cases such as this have been used to suggest that Canaanite solar worship was incorporated into the worship of Yahweh. However, Day notes that solar language being applied to Yahweh is not the same as Yahweh being equated with the sun, and there are no Hebrew names combining Yahweh and shemesh, in contrast to those combining the names of Yahweh and El or Baal. He does consider it possible that the character of Samson may reflect a tradition of a solar hero, based on the etymology of his name, his birthplace near Beth-Shemesh, details of Psalm 19, and the similarity between Samson's seven locks of hair and the depictions of Helios with seven rays emerging from his head.

Worship of the Sun is condemned in Ezekiel 8:16-18. Horses and chariots dedicated to the sun are mentioned in 2 Kings 23:11 where they are destroyed by Josiah.

== Equation with Asherah ==
The Ugaritic texts reveal significant parallels between the goddesses Athirat and Shapshu, suggesting a possible identification. Both are referred to as "Queen" (rbt), a title signifying supreme authority in the pantheon, and they are described as mothers of the gods, key figures in creation, and central to maintaining cosmic order. Athirat's epithet rbt ˀaṯrt ym has traditionally been interpreted as "Lady Athirat of the Sea," but recent analyses propose that ym might mean "day" instead of "sea." This reading aligns with Athirat's name (ˀaṯrt), meaning "the one who goes," reflecting the sun's journey across the sky.

Another significant reason for this conflation would be a passage found in Ugaritic inscription K1.23 which describes the myth known as The Gracious and Most Beautiful Gods. In this text, twins Shahar (dawn) and Shalim (dusk) are described as offspring of El through two women he meets at the seashore. The brothers are both nursed by "The Lady", likely Asherah and in other Ugaritic texts, the two are associated with the sun goddess Shapshu.

== See also ==
- Shamash
- Shams (deity)
- Yarhibol
- Malakbel
- List of solar deities
- Asherah
