= Shed (deity) =

Ancient Egyptian deity

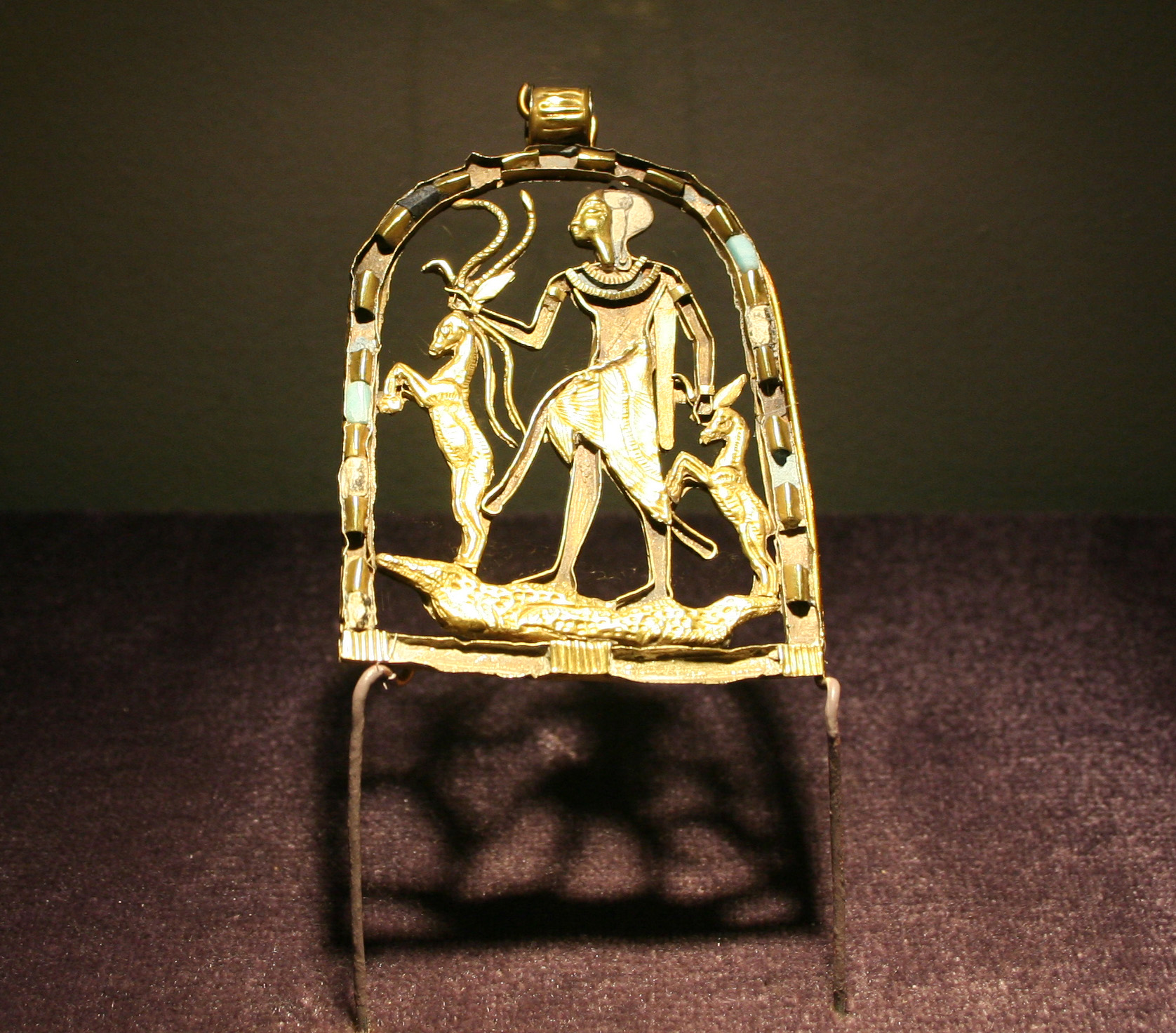
- Amulet depicting Shed subduing dangerous animals.
Name in hieroglyphs
F30 D46 A40

Shed was a deity from ancient Egyptian religion. The meaning of the name Shed (šd) is "one who saves" or "the saviour". He is first recorded after the Amarna Period. Representing the concept of salvation, Shed is identified with Horus, particularly Horus the Child. Rather than have formal worship in a temple or as an official cult, he appears to have been a god that ordinary Egyptians looked to save them from illness, misfortune or danger. He is shown on the Metternich Stela as vanquishing danger in the form of a serpent, a scorpion and a crocodile. The rise of "Savior" names in personal piety during the Amarna period has been interpreted as the popular response of ordinary people to the attempts by Akhenaten to proscribe the ancient religion of Egypt. Shed has also been viewed as a form of the Canaanite god Resheph.

Shed can be depicted as a young prince overcoming snakes, lions and crocodiles.

Shed has been viewed as a form of savior, a helper for those in need when state authority or the king's help is wanting. The increased reliance on divine assistance could even extend to saving a person from the Underworld, even to providing a substitute, and lengthening a person's time in this world. In the New Kingdom Shed "the savior" is addressed on countless stelae by people searching or praising him for help.

Mathias Neumann argues that the divine name El Shaddai in the Hebrew Bible is derived from the name of Shed.
