= Shatiqatu =

Ugaritic supernatural being

- Healing goddess, goddess of exorcisms

Shatiqatu (Ugaritic: 𐎌𐎓𐎚𐎖𐎚, šʿtqt), also vocalized as Shaʿtiqatu or Shataqat, was a figure in Ugaritic mythology, most commonly interpreted as a minor goddess by modern researchers. She is only attested in the Epic of Kirta. In this literary text, she is described as a creation of El tasked with healing the eponymous king, Kirta.

== Name and character ==
Shatiqatu's name can be translated as "she who causes evil to pass away" or "she who causes illness to pass away". It is etymologically related to the Akkadian term šūtuqu, referring to averting evil, disease or misfortune.

Various interpretations of Shatiqatu's nature have been proposed, with experts variously labeling her as a deity, another type of supernatural being (analogous to a demon, angel, genie or golem), or a human being. The first possibility is the most widespread view in scholarship. She has been specifically characterized as a "healing goddess". It has also been argued that she was portrayed as an exorcist. These two spheres were interconnected in the cultures of Ancient Near East. She is described as a creation of El, which might reflect his proposed role as the god responsible for apotropaic magic in the Ugaritic pantheon in a similar capacity as Enki in Mesopotamia.

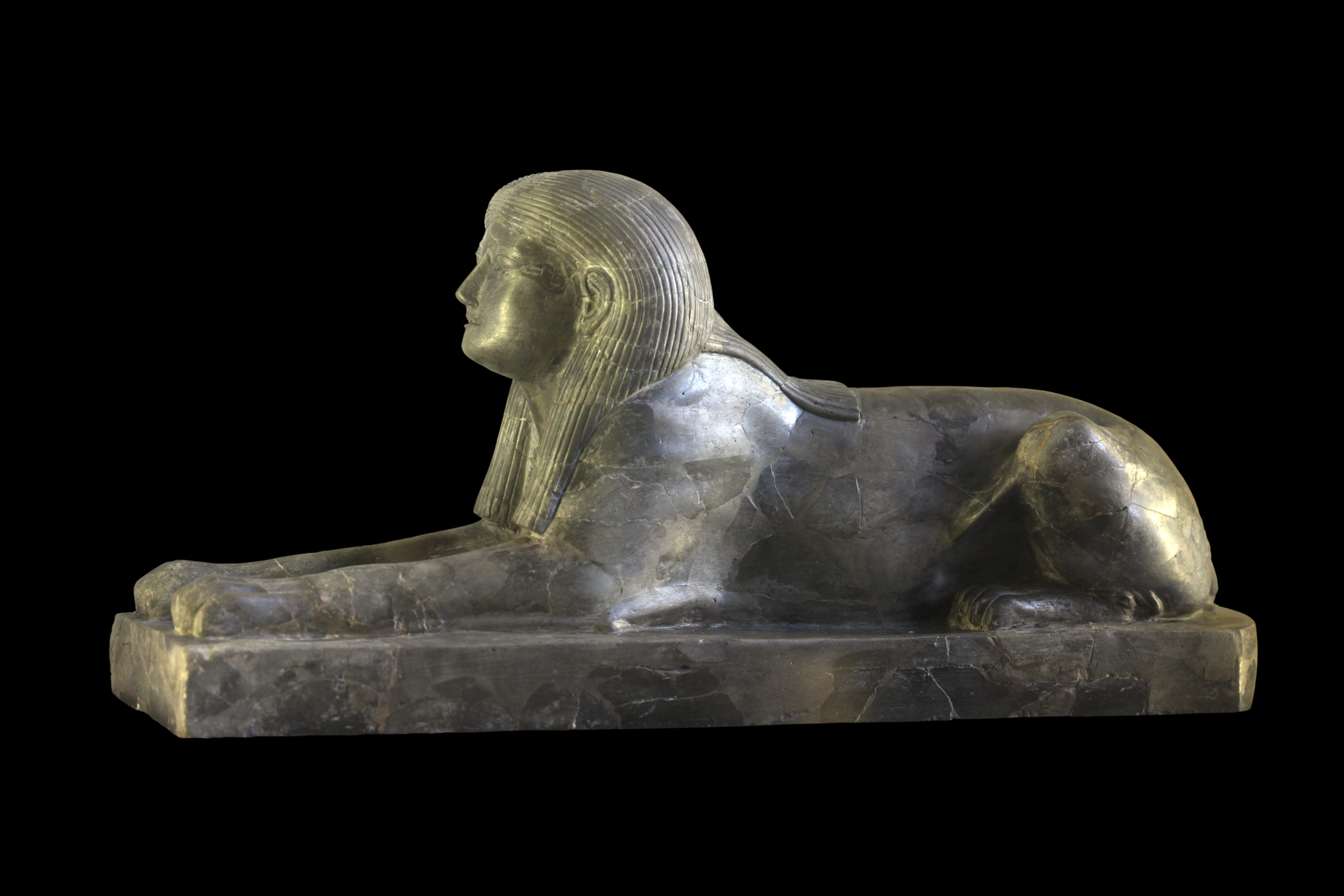
Sphinx representing the Egyptian princess Ita, found at the site of ancient Qatna .

Due to Shatiqatu's absence from known ritual texts, for example offering lists, it has been suggested that she was not an object of active worship, but merely a literary character invented by Ugaritic scribes for the sake of a specific narrative. However, it has also been proposed that statuettes of Shatiqatu could be prepared for potters to be used in healing rituals, with the procedure imitating the account of her creation in the Epic of Keret. Additionally, Paolo Matthiae argues that she might correspond to the figure of a female sphinx which recurs on cylinder seals known from various sites located in modern Syria. Said artistic motif reached this area in the early second millennium BCE, when one such a figure representing Ita, a daughter of Amenemhat II, was sent to Qatna. Matthiae suggests that Shatiqatu was a similar non-anthropomorphic figure who can be interpreted as a Syrian adaptation of the Egyptian motif of the sphinx as a representation of "the pharaoh as protector of the great necropolis of Giza", reinterpreted as a supernatural defender of kingship in its new context. However, according to Theodore J. Lewis Shatiqatu is described as anthropomorphic in the Ugaritic text she appears in.

It is a matter of debate among researchers if Shatiqatu was imagined as winged. Such an appearance would be a parallel of Mesopotamian depictions of apotropaic figures, such as Pazuzu or apkallu, but there is no certainty if the translation of a passage possibly referring to her flying is correct. Matthiae argues that if the identification with the female sphinxes in art is correct, Shatiqatu could be depicted as both winged and wingless. The Epic of Kirta describes her as equipped with a wooden staff (ḫṭ), which apparently played a role in healing.

== Shatiqatu narrative in the Epic of Kirta ==
Shatiqatu is presently known only from the Epic of Kirta, one of the three best known literary compositions from Ugarit. The known tablets were prepared by the scribe Ilimilku. The narrative focuses on the eponymous monarch, Kirta, who faces issues typical for Bronze Age rulers, including problems connected to succession, illness and revolts against his rule. It has been pointed out that while it is known from Ugarit, the city is not mentioned in the text, and the king instead lives in Khubur. The section of the composition dedicated to Shatiqatu can be found on tablet KTU 1.16, and occupies lines 5.10–6.14.

At one point in the story Kirta falls ill. It is assumed he might have been inflicted with sickness as punishment for forgetting a vow to Athirat, who he was meant to honor with generous gifts if she helps him acquire a wife, as established earlier. Apparently his state also results in a drought impacting his entire kingdom. The next section of the text is broken, but when the story resumes, El is unsuccessfully trying to find a deity who could help Kirta recover in the divine assembly. Since none of them respond to his requests, he eventually decides to create a being capable of it himself, an "expeller of sickness" and "banisher of illness". In accordance with a motif also well attested in contemporary Mesopotamian and Egyptian literature, as well as from the Book of Genesis, he uses clay to this end. A particularly close parallel is the creation of Enkidu by Aruru in the Epic of Gilgamesh. Tawny L. Holm has additionally compared the account of Shatiqatu's creation to later golem narratives. She has also been compared to a golem by Edward L. Greenstein. The lines describing the process in detail are too fragmentary to permit a fully certain restoration, though it is assumed that it ends with El tasking the freshly created Shatiqatu with driving away illness.

Baruch Margalit, who views the tale of Kirta as a parody of conventional epics, has interpreted the passage leading to Shatiqatu's creation as a case of "mock-heroic 'overkill'" which portrays El as "very wise (...) but (...) sorely lacking in common sense", as according to him Shatiqatu would not be capable of accomplishing more than a human exorcist would. This interpretation has been criticized by Theodore J. Lewis, who argues that portraying El as capable of creating new beings is meant to highlight his authority, rather than mock him. He also disagrees with Margalit's pejorative description of Shatiqatu. Margalit's conclusions regarding the narrative has also been criticized by Mark S. Smith.

Shatiqatu's subsequent activity is prefaced by a magical formula spoken by El:

O Death - be crushed!
O Shaʿtiqatu - be powerful!

She either enters Kirta's house after lamenters have seemingly already arrived to mourn his death, or laments his state herself to be granted entrance, with the second interpretation being favored by most translators. It is sometimes assumed that the next passage describes her flying over houses and villages, but according to Lewis this interpretation is not universally accepted, and likely constitutes a misreading of a damaged passage, with another, according to him more plausible, possibility being that the verbs describe illness and death taking flight to escape when she enters the patient's residence.

The specific actions Shatiqatu takes to heal Kirta are not described in detail, though the text does mention that she uses a magical staff to remove the illness from his body, and that she subsequently washes him from sweat and opens his throat, making him able to eat again. The implausibility of the alternate interpretation of the syntax of one of the lines of this section, according to which Shatiqatu would instead wash the king in sweat, has also been used to argue that a grammatically analogous passage in the Baal Cycle, KTU 1.3 II 34–35, refers to Anat washing her hands from the blood of enemies, rather than in their blood. The supernatural exorcist emerges victorious, and a variant of the formula spoken earlier by El is repeated to illustrate the defeat of death and restoration of Kirta's health:

Death is crushed,
As Shaʿtiqatu is powerful!

Lewis suggests that death might be personified in this passage, and that therefore the word mt in this case can be interpreted as the theonym Mot rather than the ordinary word. This interpretation is also supported by Paolo Matthiae.
