= Hangar 18 (film) =

1980 American science fiction action film by James L. Conway

- Theatrical release poster
- Directed by: James L. Conway
- Screenplay by: Ken Pettus
- Story by: Thomas C. Chapman; James L. Conway
- Produced by: Charles E. Sellier Jr.
- Starring: Darren McGavin; Robert Vaughn; Gary Collins; Joseph Campanella; James Hampton; Tom Hallick; Pamela Bellwood
- Cinematography: Paul Hipp
- Edited by: Michael Spence
- Music by: John Cacavas
- Production company: Sunn Classic Pictures
- Distributed by: Sunn Classic Pictures
- Release date: June 25, 1980
- Running time: 97 minutes
- Country: United States
- Language: English
- Box office: $5.8 million - $11 million

Hangar 18 is a 1980 American science fiction action film directed by James L. Conway and written by Ken Pettus, from a story by Thomas C. Chapman and Conway. It stars Darren McGavin, Robert Vaughn, Gary Collins, Joseph Campanella, James Hampton, Tom Hallick, and Pamela Bellwood.

== Plot ==
A satellite, just launched from a Space Shuttle orbiter, collides with an unidentified object, which, after being spotted on radar moving at great speeds, had positioned itself just over the ship. The collision kills an astronaut in the launch bay. The events are witnessed by Bancroft and Price, the astronauts aboard. After returning to Earth, they are stonewalled when they try to discuss what happened. Harry Forbes, deputy director of NASA, simply tells them that "everything is going to be all right".

After it makes a controlled landing in the Arizona desert, the damaged alien spacecraft is taken to Wolf Air Force Base in Texas and installed in Hangar 18, where scientists and other technicians, headed by Harry Forbes, can study it. Due to an impending presidential election, government officials are anxious to prevent any public knowledge of the event.

Meanwhile, unbeknownst to Forbes, the Air Force puts out a news story blaming Bancroft and Price for the death of their colleague and for the destruction of the satellite. The men know that they can prove their innocence by viewing the telemetry tapes which recorded the UFO; but when they view them, all evidence of the object has been erased. Through a friend who works at a remote tracking station, they see the real telemetry and discover where the alien craft landed. They set out to expose the cover-up and clear their names.

In the hangar, investigators enter the ship and find its two crew members dead. They determine that, during the collision with the satellite, chemicals were released in the craft that produced a short-lived toxic gas. They find a human woman in a stasis chamber, who later wakes up, screaming. They realize that symbols on the control panels match those used by ancient Earth civilizations. Video on the ship's computer shows extensive surveillance of power plants, military bases, industrial plants and major cities worldwide. Autopsies performed on the aliens show that they and humans had similar evolutionary processes. A scientist deduces that the ship could not have reached Earth on its own, but must have been launched from a much larger, faster and more long-ranged mother ship.

In their pursuit of the truth, Bancroft and Price get closer to Hangar 18 but are targets of government agents. They elude one team, who are killed during a high-speed chase. Later, they find that the brakes on their rental car have stopped working, and after careening along roads, they come to rest on the grounds of a gas refinery. Agents begin shooting at them, so they drive off in an oil tanker. With the agents in pursuit, Price climbs onto the tanker, lets some gas out of the truck, lights an emergency flare, and tosses it. Their pursuers crash and are killed, but Price is fatally shot. When Forbes learns of Price's death, he demands the Air Force to take Bancroft to Hangar 18, or he will go to the press with the truth. Their cover-up and careers now threatened, government officials decide to remotely fly an explosives-filled plane into Hangar 18 to destroy all evidence of the event.

The researchers have determined that the aliens have been to Earth before and that human beings are, in fact, their descendants. Further examination of the video footage reveals that the industrial and military sites are "designated landing areas", suggesting that the aliens are preparing to return.

When Bancroft arrives at the base, he crashes through the base's security gate and, hiding in a warehouse, is discovered by Forbes, who takes him to Hangar 18 and the alien craft. Just as a researcher reveals that a translation of the aliens' language indicates that they are about to return, the plane crashes into Hangar 18, creating a huge explosion.

The next day, a news report says that Bancroft, Forbes and their group of technicians survived the blast, shielded inside an alien spacecraft. Forbes schedules a press conference for that afternoon.

== Cast ==
- Gary Collins as Steve Bancroft
- James Hampton as Lew Price
- Robert Vaughn as Gordon Cain
- Pamela Bellwood as Dr. Sarah Michaels
- Andrew Bloch as linguist Neal Kelso
- Philip Abbott as Lieutenant General Frank Morrison
- Joseph Campanella as Frank Lafferty
- Tom Hallick as Phil Cameron
- Steven Keats as Paul Bannister
- William Schallert as Professor Mills
- Darren McGavin as NASA Deputy Director Harry Forbes
- Cliff Osmond as Sheriff Duane Barlow
- Bill Zuckert as "Ace" Landon
- Stuart Pankin as Sam Tate
- H. M. Wynant as flight director

== Production ==
=== Background ===
The film was both produced and released by Sunn Classic Pictures, an American independent film studio and distributor known mainly in the 1970s for speculative documentary films about Bigfoot, ancient astronauts, near death experiences, the Bermuda Triangle, with titles such as In Search of Noah's Ark and In Search of Historic Jesus."

=== Genre and sources of inspiration ===
By 1980, director James L. Conway and three of the four writers were Sunn veterans, but this was Sunn's first attempt at a conspiracy science fiction film in the vein of Capricorn One, released two years earlier. The story is derived from the Roswell incident and contemporary rumors about Area 51. The title is believed to stem from hoaxer Robert Spencer Carr, who, in 1974, named Hangar 18 as the storage location of bodies from the 1948 Aztec UFO hoax.

Beyond the conspiracy source material above, Jim Knipfel identifies homages to Close Encounters of the Third Kind and "several" episodes of The Twilight Zone, as well as a nod to Nigel Kneale's Quatermass and others.

=== Principal photography ===
Shooting took place in Midland and Big Spring, Texas, and at the former Pyote Air Force Base, as well as the former Webb Air Force Base. Filming also took place in Salt Lake City, Utah.

== Marketing ==
Jim Knipfel points out that the film's TV spots, it claimed to "reveal the truth" about UFOs despite including shots of an orbiting Space Shuttle orbiting the Earth "even though the shuttle hadn't yet been launched on its maiden voyage." The spots reflect the film's "traditional Sunn crawl, insisting what we are about to see is a true story ... thanks to the helpful cooperation of a few brave souls who stepped forward to tell the truth."

== Release ==
Hangar 18 was released in the United States in June 25, 1980, and in Ireland on March 13, 1981. It was one of the very few American films to be shown theatrically in the Soviet Union, and was also broadcast on the Soviet television channel Programme One, premiering on January 1, 1982. Due to the limited number of science fiction and action films available to the Soviet public, Hangar 18 became quite popular with the youth of the country.

A version with a different ending was televised under the title Invasion Force.

Hangar 18 was released on Blu-ray on June 25, 2013.

== Reception ==
On the review aggregator website Rotten Tomatoes, the film has a score of 40% based on five reviews.

When the film was released, The New York Times film critic Vincent Canby dismissed it: "Hangar 18 is the sort of melodrama that pretends to be skeptical, but requires that everyone watching it be profoundly gullible ... It stars ... Robert Vaughn as the ruthless and fatally unimaginative White House Chief of Staff ... In the supporting cast is Debra MacFarlane, who plays a beautiful female specimen found aboard the saucer, a young woman who looks amazingly like a Hollywood starlet. But then, I guess, she is. The flying saucer itself looks like an oversized toy that might have been made in Taiwan."

Christopher John reviewed the film in Ares Magazine #8, writing, "Hanger 18 [sic] is the perfect Sunday evening movie for television. If you watch closely, you can even see the spaces they planned for the commercials."

In his review of Hangar 18 for his 2015 Movie Guide, Leonard Maltin opined that the alternate conclusion used in Invasion Force (the television version of the film) undermines the entire movie.

== Legacy ==
Director Conway would revisit the subject matter of Hangar 18 in "Little Green Men", an episode of Star Trek: Deep Space Nine in which characters accidentally travel back in time to 1947 and crash near Roswell, New Mexico. The building in which their ship is subsequently stored is designated Hangar 18.

Hangar 18 was featured in an episode of Mystery Science Theater 3000 in 1989 when it was still a local show.

== See also ==
- The Bamboo Saucer, a 1968 science fiction film about the United States and the Soviet Union competing to recover a UFO that has crashed in China
