= James L. Conway =

American film and television director, producer, and writer

- Born: October 27, 1950 (age 76); New York City, U.S.
- Education: University of Denver
- Occupations: Film and television director; producer; writer; studio executive; novelist
- Known for: Star Trek, Charmed, Smallville, The Orville, Hangar 18
- Spouse: Rebecca Balding
- Website: jameslconway.com

James L. Conway (born October 27, 1950) is an American film and television director, producer, writer, studio executive, and novelist. He is best known for his early feature film work with Sunn Classic Pictures, his prolific television directing career—particularly across the Star Trek franchise, Charmed, Smallville, and The Orville—and his tenure as Executive Vice President of Spelling Television.

== Early life and career ==
Conway was born in New York City on October 27, 1950. While a senior studying mass communications at the University of Denver around 1971, he was hired by producer Charles E. Sellier Jr. to edit industrial films and commercials.

=== Sunn Classic Pictures ===
Conway began his motion picture career in the 1970s working as a writer, producer, and director for the Utah-based independent production and distribution company Sunn Classic Pictures. At Sunn Classic, he helmed theatrical docudramas marketed through four-wall distribution, including In Search of Noah's Ark (1976) and Beyond and Back (1978), and produced In Search of Historic Jesus (1979).

As the studio expanded into scripted entertainment, Conway transitioned to directing fictional feature films, including the sci-fi thriller Hangar 18 (1980), the cult horror film The Boogens (1981), and Earthbound (1981). During this period, he also directed television films such as Last of the Mohicans and Incredible Rocky Mountain Race, as well as the NBC miniseries Greatest Heroes of the Bible. In 1981, he received a Primetime Emmy Award nomination for Outstanding Children's Program for The Legend of Sleepy Hollow.

=== Television and Spelling Television ===
Conway established a long career directing and producing episodic television. His directing credits span genres including science fiction, fantasy, and drama, with episodes of The Magicians, Aquarius, Supernatural, Smallville, Psych, 90210, Charmed, The Orville, University Hospital, the 1994 remake of Burke's Law, Paradise, and Matt Houston.

From 1996 to 2002, Conway served as Executive Vice President of Spelling Television, overseeing more than twenty television series including 7th Heaven, Melrose Place, and Beverly Hills, 90210. He later served as a consulting producer and co-executive producer on Charmed from its third through eighth seasons.

=== Novelist ===
Inspired by detective fiction authors such as Dashiell Hammett and Raymond Chandler, Conway began writing Hollywood-set mystery novels in 2012. His published novels include Dead and Not So Buried (2012), Sexy Babe (2012), and In Cold Blonde (2013).

== Select filmography ==
=== Director ===
- The Orville
- The Magicians
- Aquarius
- Supernatural
- 90210
- Charmed
- Star Trek: Enterprise
- Star Trek: Deep Space Nine
- Kindred: The Embraced
- Star Trek: Voyager
- Star Trek: Borg
- Legend
- University Hospital
- Burke's Law
- Star Trek: The Next Generation
- Tour of Duty
- Hunter
- MacGyver
- Hotel
- Matt Houston
- Psych
- Smallville
- The Boogens (1981)
- Earthbound (1981)
- Hangar 18 (1980)
- Beyond and Back (1978)
- In Search of Noah's Ark (1976)

=== Producer ===
- Charmed (co-executive producer, seasons 4–8; consulting producer, seasons 3–4)
- All Souls (consulting producer)
- Paradise
- In Search of Historic Jesus (1979)

=== Writer ===
- University Hospital
- Burke's Law (developed by)
- Bodies of Evidence (creator)
- Paradise
- Matt Houston
- Hangar 18 (1980; story)
- In Search of Noah's Ark (1976)

== Star Trek television directing ==
Conway directed 18 episodes across four Star Trek television series: The Next Generation (3), Deep Space Nine (7), Voyager (4), and Enterprise (4).

Star Trek: The Next Generation

- "Justice"
- "The Neutral Zone"
- "Frame of Mind"

Star Trek: Deep Space Nine

- "Duet"
- "Necessary Evil"
- "The Way of the Warrior"
- "Little Green Men"
- "Shattered Mirror"
- "For the Cause"
- "Apocalypse Rising"

Star Trek: Voyager

- "The 37's"
- "Persistence of Vision"
- "Death Wish"
- "Innocence"

Star Trek: Enterprise

- "Broken Bow"
- "Judgment"
- "Damage"
- "In a Mirror, Darkly"
