= Beyond and Back =

1978 film

- Theatrical release poster
- Directed by: James L. Conway
- Written by: Stephen Lord; Ralph Wilkerson
- Produced by: Charles E. Sellier Jr.
- Starring: Vern Adix; Linda Bishop
- Narrated by: Brad Crandall
- Cinematography: Henning Schellerup
- Edited by: Kent Schafer
- Music by: Bob Summers
- Distributed by: Sunn Classic Pictures
- Release date: 1978
- Running time: 95 minutes
- Country: United States
- Language: English
- Box office: $23.8 million (US/Canada)

Beyond and Back is a 1978 American documentary/"death-sploitation flick" produced and distributed by Sunn Classic Pictures that deals with the subject of near death experiences.

== Production notes ==
Beyond and Back was produced by Sunn Classic Pictures, a Utah-based independent film company that specialized in releasing low-budget message movies to non-urban audiences. Along with such features as In Search of Noah's Ark (1976) and In Search of Historic Jesus (1979), the film was one of a series of releases from the company that attempted to present convincing scientific evidence for Christian theology.

Based in part on a book by evangelist Ralph Wilkerson, the idea for Beyond and Back was suggested to Sunn Pictures by a freelance writer who submitted a treatment for the film after reading about the film studio in Writer's Digest. The film's screenwriter, Stephen Lord, was a respected television screenwriter, having written scripts for such notable sci-fi/horror programs as The Outer Limits and Kolchak: The Night Stalker. The director was James L. Conway, who had helmed Sunn's speculative fiction vehicle The Lincoln Conspiracy the previous year. The movie was filmed by cinematographer Henning Schellerup, a veteran of late 1960s and early 1970s porn films such as Come One, Come All (1970) and Heterosexualis (1973).

Parts of the film were shot in Park City, Salt Lake City, and Heber in Utah.

== Promotion ==
Since Beyond and Back never received a traditional wide release, it was able to largely avoid scrutiny from the national media. Sunn Classic Pictures mostly screened its films in smaller towns and non-urban areas. It was also popular at drive-in movie theaters. This approach "avoided the audiences and the critical media in Los Angeles and New York... if the film failed in any single market, negative word of mouth did not spread to the next locale."

== Born-again Christian background and content ==
Filmed entirely on location in Utah, Beyond and Back was produced by Charles E. Sellier Jr. At the time of the film's release, Sellier noted that he:

"Believe(s) God wants me to do the films I do, otherwise He wouldn't have made me a success."

== Critical and box office reception ==
The New York Times film critic Janet Maslin criticized the film for its inability to answer the many questions it raised, adding:

"Do you know real malarkey when you hear it? What would you consider a fair price for the Brooklyn Bridge?".

In his January 1979 Chicago Sun-Times review, Roger Ebert gave the film one star, noting that it:

"Gives turkeys a bad name. It exists on about the same cinematic level as an Army training film or one of those junior high chemistry movies in which the experiments never quite worked."

The film appears on rogerebert.com, "Ebert's Most Hated" list, as well as in his 2000 book, I Hated, Hated, Hated This Movie.

Produced very inexpensively, the film was a major commercial success. It grossed nearly $24 million in U.S. box office receipts and was one of the top 30 top-earning films in the U.S. for 1978.

== Beyond Death's Door (1979) ==
Beyond Death’s Door (1979) was a follow-up to Beyond and Back. Directed by Henning Schellerup, it featured a framing story of three doctors working at a hospital, and their experiences with patients’ descriptions of Heaven, Hell and out-of-body experiences. The film featured vignettes from its predecessor, including the segments on reincarnation and Duncan MacDougall's "21 grams experiment".

The film was based on the book of the same name, written by Maurice Rawlings.
