= Four-wall distribution =

Type of film distribution

In the film industry, four-wall distribution (also known as four-walling) is a process through which a studio or distributor rents movie theaters for a period of time and receives all of the box-office revenue. The four walls of a movie theater give the term its name. Companies engaging in this practice were common in the United States during the late 1960s and 1970s; one of them was the Utah-based Sunn Classic Pictures.

== History ==
Four-wall distribution is termed after the four walls of a movie theater. In this process, a film company rents a movie theater from the theater's owner for a flat fee, typically for one or two weekends. The film company receives all of the box-office revenue, while the theater keeps sales from popcorn and concessions. By contrast, with normal releases theaters and distributors share ticket sales.

Use of the four-wall technique has been uncommon since the late 1960s and 1970s, when a host of U.S. companies engaged in this method. They tended to operate in states such as Utah, Oregon, Florida, and Texas, but this practice was not used in major markets such as New York City, Los Angeles, and Chicago.

An early entrant in this field was American National Enterprises (ANE), which was set up in 1965 by three Utah residents— Russel Niehart, Robert Crosier, and Frank Olson. One of the distributor's first releases was Alaskan Safari, a 1968 nature documentary whose viewership exceeded over 5.5 million patrons over a five-year run. Rayland Jensen handled distribution of the film; in 1971, at the request of employees from the Schick razor company, other ANE members and he established their own outlet, Sunn Classic Pictures. Like its predecessor, Sunn also specialized in four-walled releases, among them a 1973 reissue of Chariots of the Gods, 1974's The Life and Times of Grizzly Adams, 1976's In Search of Noah's Ark, and 1977's The Lincoln Conspiracy.

In addition to Sunn, various other companies including Doty-Dayton of Utah and Pacific International Enterprises of Oregon practiced four-wall engagements. The process was also used by animation company Filmation for its 1974 release of Journey Back to Oz, via a partnership with Seymour Borde. Also in 1974, the Walter Reade Theater in New York City held a four-wall run of Ladies and Gentlemen: The Rolling Stones, a concert film from Dragonaire Inc. Filmmaker Tom Laughlin used the four-wall technique for his film, Billy Jack, after accusing its distributor Warner Bros. of improperly handling the movie.

As recently as the 1990s and 2000s, examples of four-walled releases included the films of Warren Miller; 1992's Brother's Keeper, by Joe Berlinger and Bruce Sinofsky; and the annual short-subject anthology Spike and Mike's Festival of Animation.

Filmmaker Joe Camp expressed concern over the four-wall movement and told Variety in 1977: "It has become an industry-caused thing, but the G rated classification has to some degree become 'if it's G, it can't be for me'." Camp observed that four-wall companies had saturated the market for G-rated product; in response to the lowered-down quality of their films, he created the 1974 family film Benji.

Four-wall distribution has copyright implications; a film distributed through four-wall distribution, and no other method, may classify as an unpublished work. Because of this, Deep Throat, a pornographic film distributed exclusively through four-wall distribution during its theatrical release, did not officially become published until it was released on home video over a decade later; had the film been distributed traditionally, it would have immediately lapsed into the public domain for lack of a copyright notice (such a notice has been included on all home video releases).

== See also ==
- Roadshow theatrical release
