= Searches for Noah's Ark =

Regarded as pseudoarchaeology by geologists and archaeologists

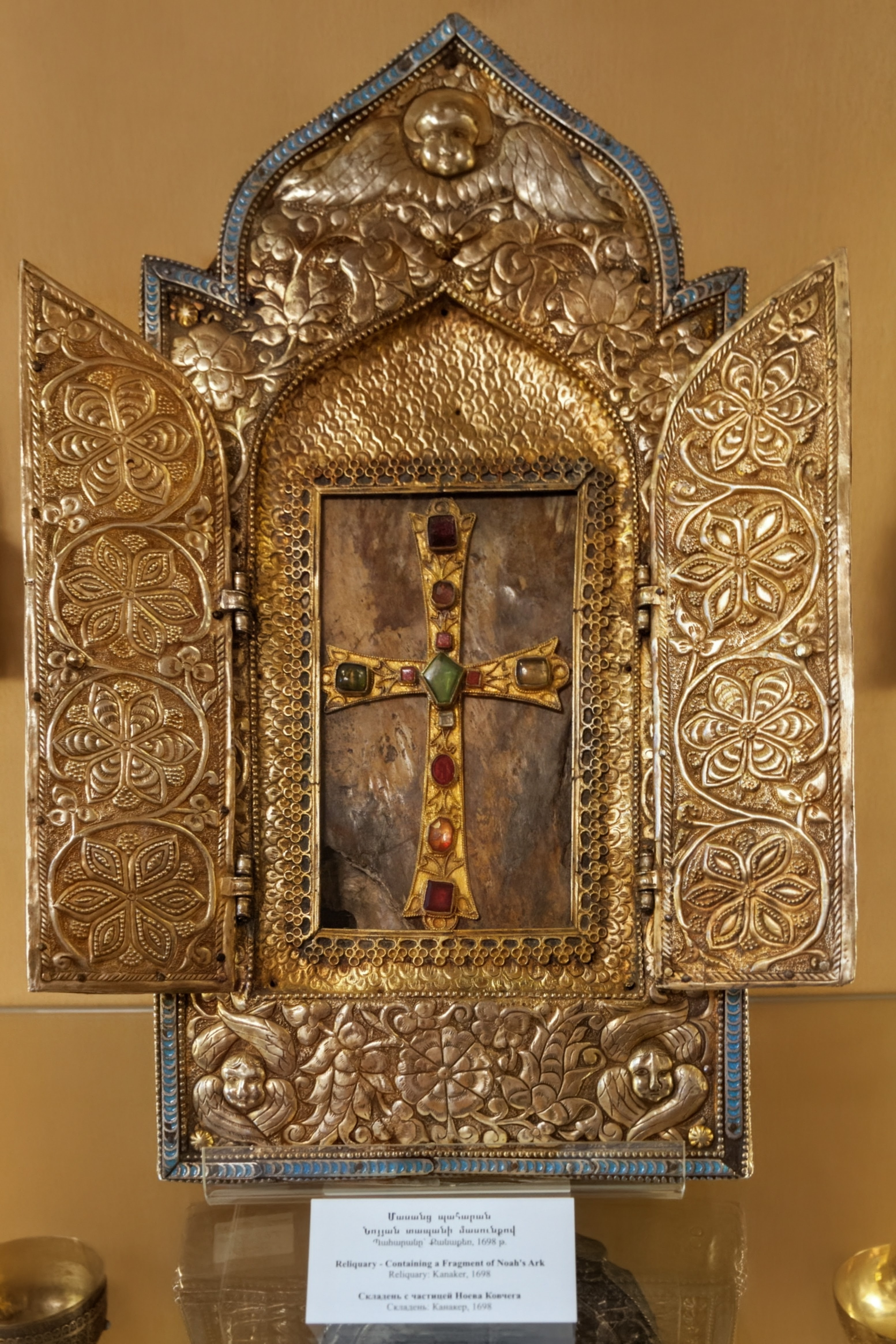
A reliquary displaying a piece of wood at the museum of Etchmiadzin Cathedral in Armenia, said to be from Noah's Ark. By tradition Jacob of Nisibis received the wood from an angel during his search for the Ark.

Searches for Noah's Ark have been reported since antiquity, as ancient scholars sought to affirm the historicity of the Genesis flood narrative by citing accounts of relics recovered from the Ark. With the emergence of biblical archaeology in the 19th century, the potential of a formal search attracted interest in alleged discoveries and hoaxes. By the 1940s, expeditions were being organized to follow up on these apparent leads. This modern search movement has been informally called "arkeology".

In 2020, the young Earth creationist group the Institute for Creation Research acknowledged that, despite many expeditions, Noah's Ark had not been found and is unlikely to be found. Many of the supposed findings and methods used in the search are regarded as pseudoscience and pseudoarchaeology by geologists and archaeologists.

== Antiquity ==
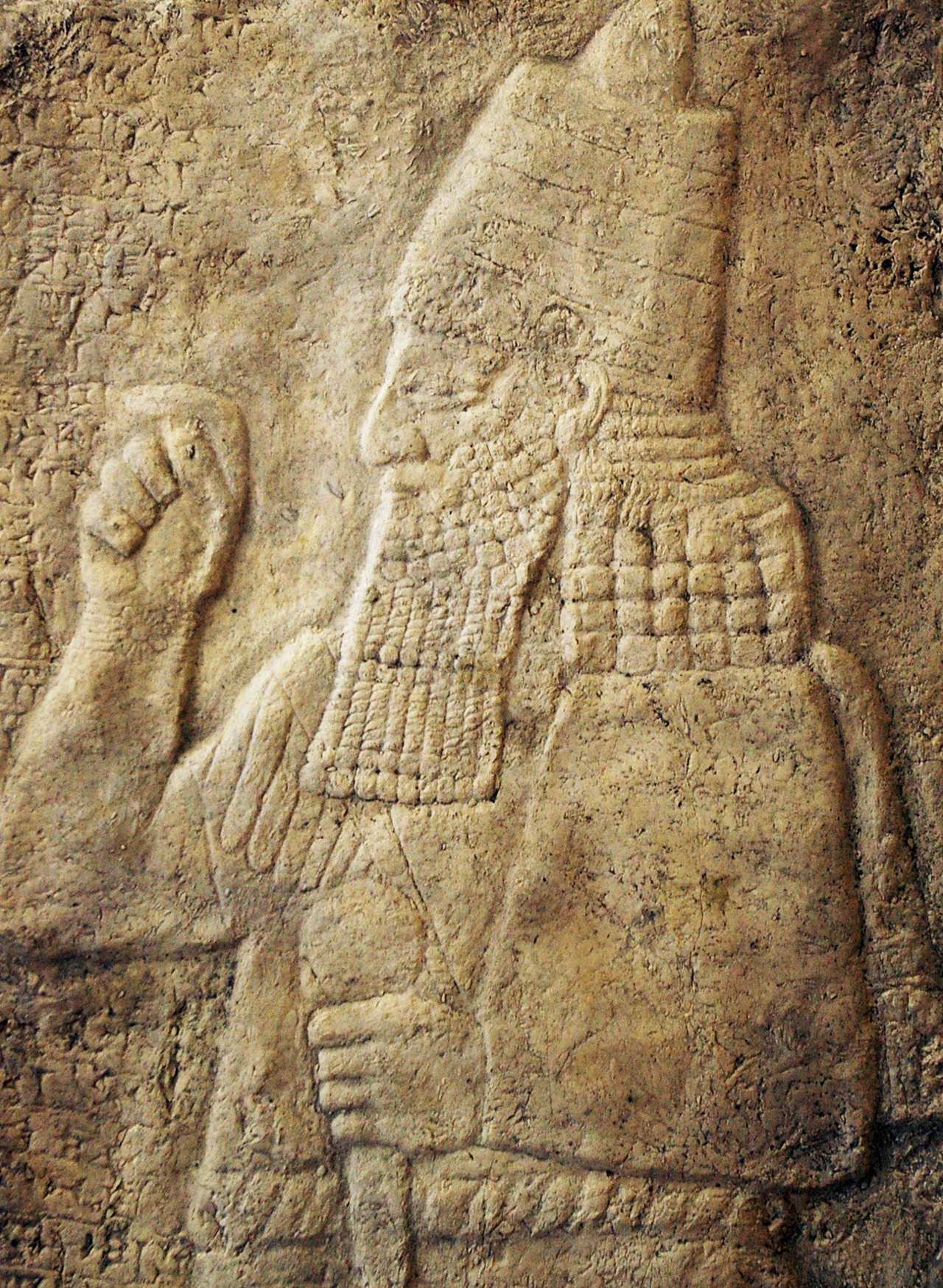
Cast of a rock relief of Sennacherib carved at Mount Judi. The Talmud suggests he visited Noah's Ark in the 7th century BCE.

At the end of the Genesis flood narrative, when the flooding subsides, the Ark is said to come to rest "on the mountains of Ararat." The Book of Jubilees specifies a particular mountain, naming it "Lûbâr". The Torah does not describe any particular holiness about the Ark, and so little attention is given to its fate after Noah's departure.

According to the Talmud, the Assyrian king Sennacherib found a beam from the Ark and, reasoning that it was the god who delivered Noah from the flood, fashioned the wood into an idol. This expands upon the biblical account of Sennacherib worshiping in the temple of Nisroch, interpreting the god's name to be derived from the Hebrew word neser ("beam"). A Midrash regarding the Book of Esther says that the gallows erected by Haman was built using a beam from the Ark.

Opinions on the location of "the mountains of Ararat" have varied since antiquity. Interpretations of the Noah story were influenced by the Armenian flood myth about Masis, and the Syrian version about Qardu in Corduene, until these locations became conflated. The targumim for Genesis 8 interpret "Ararat" as "Qadron" and "Kardu" (i.e., Corduene). In his recounting of the Flood, Josephus seeks to link the story of Noah to the Sumerian flood myth as described by Berossus, Hieronymus of Cardia, Mnaseas of Patrae, and Nicolaus of Damascus, thereby placing Noah's Ark on a mountain in Armenia, where he says relics from the ship are exhibited "to this day." However, Josephus later describes Carrhae as the location of the Ark, again claiming that the locals would show the remains to visitors. Jerome of Stridon translated "Ararat" as "Armenia" in the Vulgate, whereas the Armenians themselves associated Noah's Ark with Corduene until the 11th century.

In the early Christian church, stories about the remains of Noah's Ark were regarded as evidence that the ship had been located, identified, and preserved in some form. This became useful in Christian apologetics for affirming the events of the Pentateuch as fact. Epiphanius of Salamis wrote: "Thus even today the remains of Noah’s ark are still shown in Cardyaei." Similarly, John Chrysostom proposed to ask non-believers: "Have you heard of the Flood—of that universal destruction? That was not just a threat, was it? Did it not really come to pass—was not this mighty work carried out? Do not the mountains of Armenia testify to it, where the Ark rested? And are not the remains of the Ark preserved there to this very day for our admonition?" However, with the widespread adoption of Christianity in Europe, the apologetic value of Ark relics diminished, as there were far fewer non-believers to persuade.

By the 5th century, a legend had arisen that Jacob of Nisibis scaled a mountain in search of Noah's Ark. As related by Faustus of Byzantium, Jacob and his party traveled to the mountains of Armenia, and "came to Sararad mountain which was in the borders of the Ayraratean lordship, in the district of Korduk'." Near the summit, an angel visited him in his sleep, instructing him to climb no further. In consolation, the angel provided Jacob with a board taken from the Ark. Jacob brought the artifact back to the city, which is said to have preserved the relic ever since. Agathangelos relates a similar story, although not directly related to the Ark, in which the 3rd century Armenian king Tiridates scales Masis and brings back eight rocks to use in the foundation of new churches.

== Middle Ages and early modern period ==
In the 7th century, the Etymologiae states "Ararat is a mountain in Armenia where the historians testify that the Ark came to rest after the Flood." The Quran describes the Ark landing on "al-jūdī," which is understood to refer to Qardu, now known as Mount Judi. Heraclius is reported to have scaled Mount Judi to visit the site of the Ark in either 628 or 629. One legend claims that Omar ibn al-Khaṭṭāb removed the Ark from a site near Nisibis and used the wood to construct a mosque.

Despite the longstanding association of Armenia with Ararat in Western Christianity, Christians in Armenia did not adopt the idea of Masis as the landing site of the Ark until the arrival of Crusaders in the late 11th century. Thereafter, Armenians adopted the Western identification of Masis as "Mount Ararat", and relocated the Jacob of Nisibis legend to that peak. The angel's admonition to Jacob became a new explanation for the pre-Christian taboo against climbing the sacred mountain. Regardless of this cultural impediment, other travelers claimed the summit was physically inaccessible, due to the permanent snow line and an abundance of precipices.

Late medieval reports from Ararat often mentioned the survival of Ark fragments, but there was less consensus about whether the vessel itself survived. Petachiah of Regensburg simply declared "the Ark is not there, for it has decayed." Just over a century later, however, Hayton of Corycus claimed that "on the mountain's summit something black is visible, which people say is the Ark."

Sir Walter Raleigh objected to the view that the Ark landed in Armenia, arguing that the Armenian mountains could merely be a sub-range of "the mountains of Ararat." He proposed a definition of "Ararat" that would encompass the Taurus, Caucasus, Sariphi, and Paropamisus mountain ranges. This interpretation would allow the Ark to have landed to the east of Mesopotamia, which Raleigh felt was necessary to explain why Noah's descendants migrated to Shinar "from the east" in Genesis 11:2.

== 19th century ==
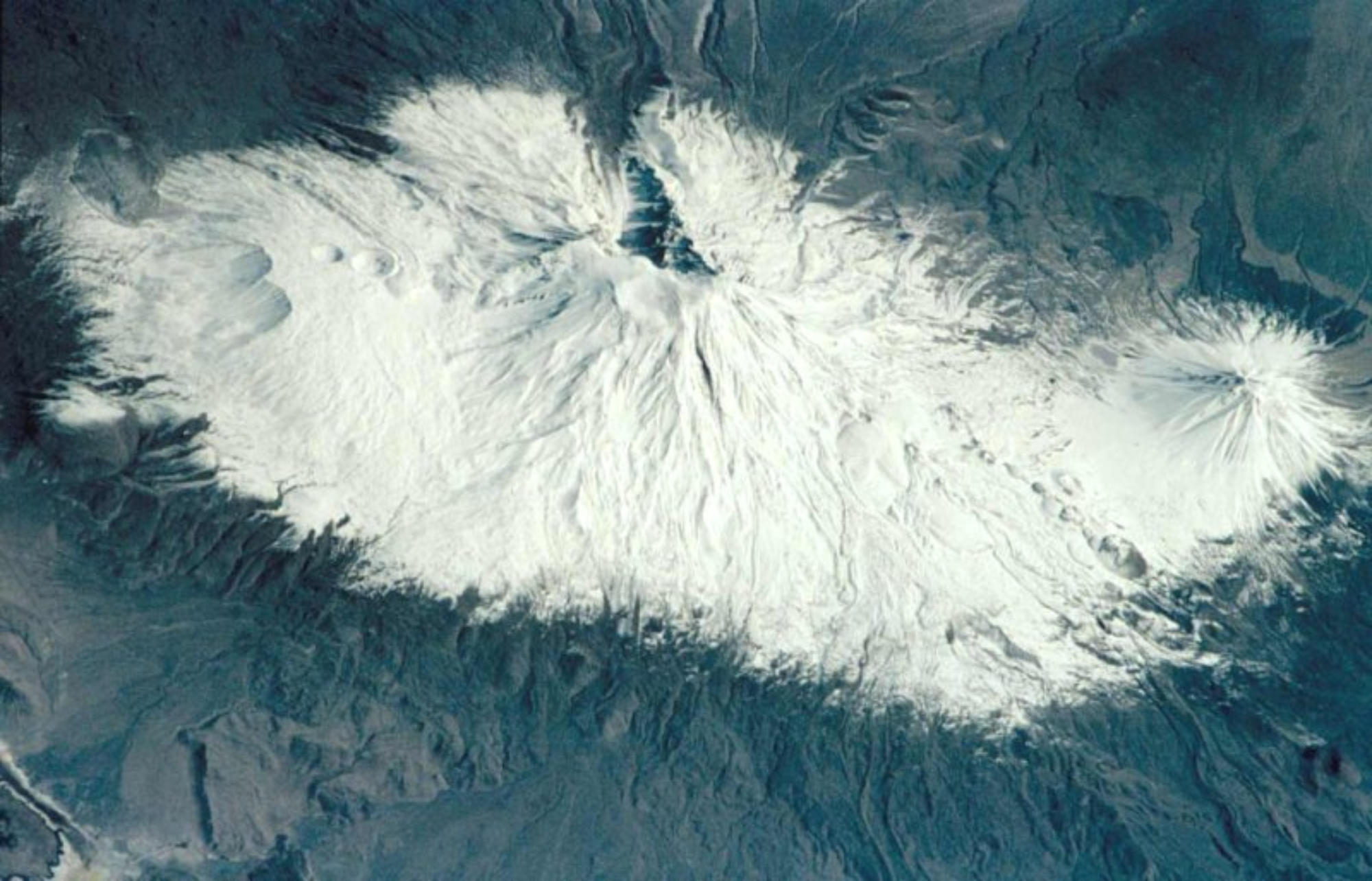
Mount Ararat

The first recorded ascent of Ararat was led by Friedrich Parrot in 1829. In his account of the expedition, Parrot wrote that "all the Armenians are firmly persuaded that Noah's Ark remains to this very day on the top of Ararat, and that, in order to preserve it, no human being is allowed to approach it."

James Bryce scaled Ararat in 1876. On his ascent, he discovered "a piece of wood about four feet long and five inches thick, evidently cut by some tool, and so far above the limit of trees that it could by no possibility be a natural fragment of one." Bryce cut off a portion of the wood to keep, and later argued that it might plausibly be a remnant of Noah's ark. Although he admitted another explanation for the wood had occurred to him, he determined that "no man is bound to discredit his own relic."

=== New Zealand Herald hoax ===
On 26 March 1883, an avalanche was reported at Mount Ararat which destroyed several villages. As an April Fools' Day joke, George McCullagh Reed, writing as "Pollex" for his opinion column in the New Zealand Herald, claimed that the avalanche had revealed the remains of Noah's Ark. Reed's story largely takes the form of a dispatch supposedly received from the Levant Herald in Constantinople, which he believed to have ceased operations several years earlier; in fact the paper had by that time relaunched as the Eastern Express. The report describes the findings of "Commissioners appointed by the Turkish Government", including a nonexistent English scientist named "Captain Gascoyne", which had already been submitted to Sultan Abdul Hamid II and the German ambassador to the Ottoman Empire. A reference to "an enterprising American traveller" seeking to purchase the Ark for exhibition in the United States was intended by Reed to be recognized as P. T. Barnum.

Over the next several months, Reed's prank was picked up by newspapers around the world. While some publications presented the story tongue-in-cheek, others uncritically reprinted much of what Reed originally wrote, attributing it (as he had) to a correspondent in Constantinople. On 24 November, Reed wrote another column apologizing for the hoax and expressing amusement that the story had spread so far:

"From the London Times to the Glasgow Herald, from the Leeds Mercury to the Pall Mall Gazette, through all the principal metropolitan and provincial journals in Britain and all over America my friend Captain Gascoyne and our Ark have been honoured with being handed on; but the editor of the Prophetic Messenger is to be credited with the greatest zeal in establishing the authenticity."

Despite this retraction, the story has continued to be circulated, often referencing the Prophetic Messenger article, which Tim LaHaye and John D. Morris called "the most complete and accurate account of the discovery."

=== John Joseph Nouri ===
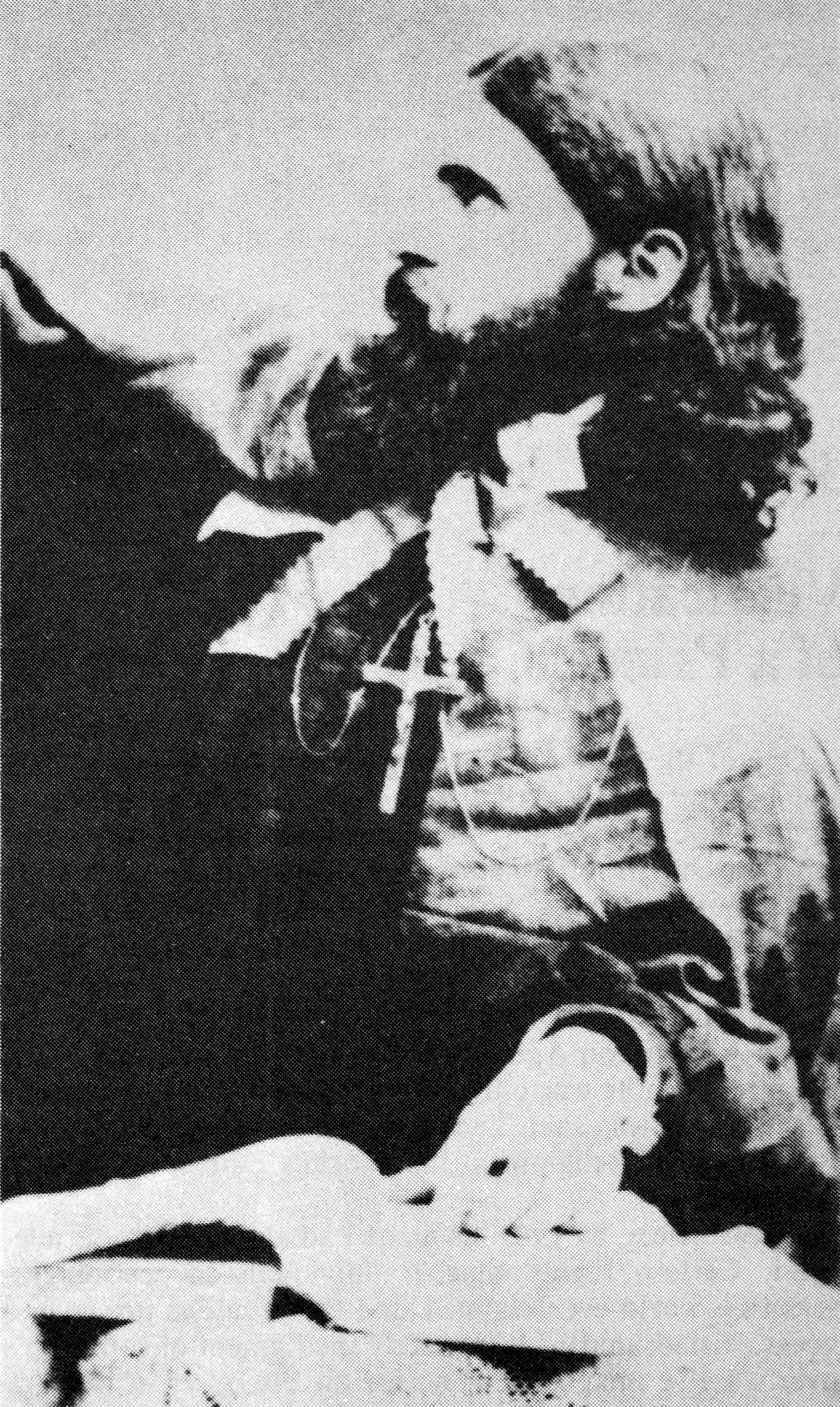
John Joseph Nouri

John Joseph Nouri claimed to have discovered Noah's Ark on the summit of Mount Ararat in April 1887. Little else about him is known for certain. He was born in Baghdad in 1865, and in 1885 he was consecrated as an archdeacon in the Chaldean Catholic Church. During his tour of the United States, he attracted attention with his long list of formal titles: "His Pontifical Eminence, the most Venerable Prelate, Monseignior. The Zamorin Nouri. John Joseph Prince of Nouri, D.D, LL., D. (By Divine Providence.) Chaldean Patriarchal Archdeacon of Babylon and Jerusalem, Grand Apostolic Ambassador of Malabar, India and Persia. The Discoveror of Noah's Ark and the Golden Mountains of the Moon. The Sacred Crown's Supreme Representative General of the Holy Orthodox, Oriental, Patriarchal Imperiality of 900,000,000 People of Asia. The First Universal Exploring Traveler of One Million Miles." Those who knew him, including J. O. Kinnaman, Frederick G. Coan, and John Henry Barrows, regarded him as a charismatic, well-traveled scholar who spoke multiple languages.

In 1893, Nouri attended the Parliament of the World's Religions in Chicago. By his account, he was invited to the event to speak about his encounter with the Ark, although the official reports of the event do not say whether such a lecture occurred. Later that year, while visiting San Francisco, Nouri was robbed and left at the Napa Insane Asylum, which took him into custody as a patient. Although he eventually arranged his release, the incident raised questions about his mental state and, therefore, the legitimacy of his extraordinary claims. Upon researching the case for a 2014 paper, Emrah Şahin concluded that "Nouri, though of an unusual character, was sane." An 1897 report that Nouri had been crowned Patriarch at the Chaldean Pontifical Cathedral at Thrissur has been taken as vindication of his authenticity. Nevertheless, Turkish officials did not corroborate his claim of discovering Noah's Ark.

== 20th century ==
Searches since the mid-20th century have been largely supported by evangelical, millenarian churches and sustained by ongoing popular interest, faith-based magazines, lecture tours, videos and occasional television specials.

=== Alleged Russian expedition ===
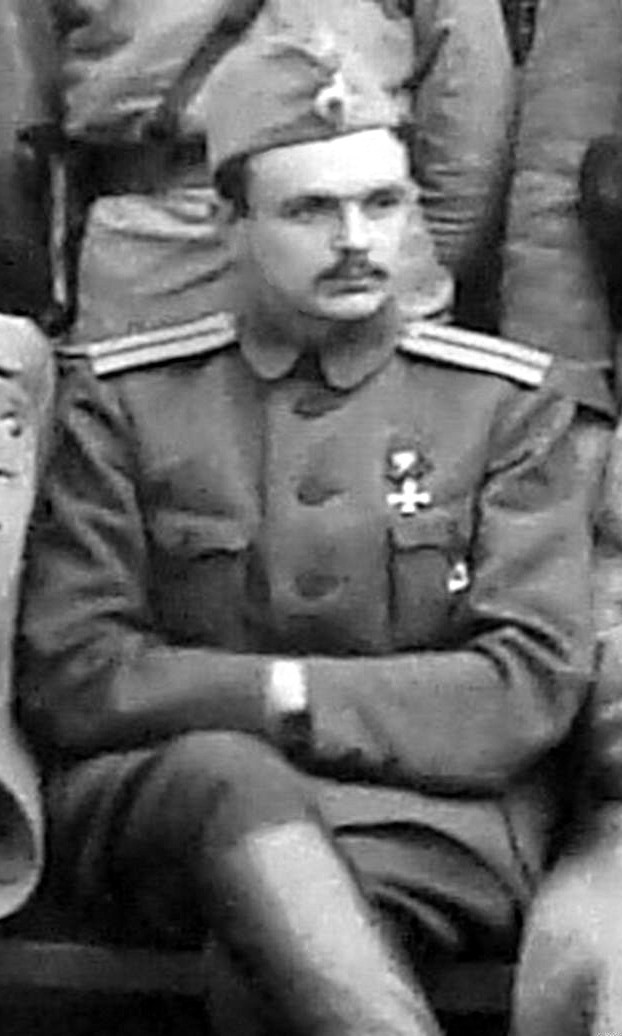
Alexander A. Koor claimed to have learned in 1921 about a Russian expedition to find Noah's Ark.

In 1940 the article "Noah's Ark Found" appeared in a special edition of New Eden, one of several booklets published in Los Angeles by Floyd M. Gurley. The article was credited to "Vladimir Roskovitsky", and contained his account of discovering Noah's Ark on Mount Ararat circa 1917, "just before the Russian revolution."

According to the story, Roskovitsky was a Russian aviator stationed 25 miles (40 km) northeast of Ararat. In August (no year is provided) he was ordered to perform a test flight of an airplane equipped with a new supercharger. Flying near Ararat, Roskovitsky and his co-pilot spotted an enormous shipwreck on the shore of a lake on the mountain. His captain later identified the wreckage as Noah's Ark, and submitted a report to the government, which sent 150 soldiers to the site. The expedition's report was supposedly sent to the tsar just days before "godless Bolshevism took over," causing the report to be suppressed and presumably destroyed "to discredit all religion and belief in the truth of the Bible." Roskovitsky, identified as a White Russian, is said to have fled to the United States to enjoy the freedom to pursue his newfound faith.

The story is inconsistent with Russian history, as Tsar Nicholas II abdicated the throne at the end of the February Revolution, months before the Bolsheviks took power in the October Revolution. References to parachutes, oxygen cans, and superchargers in aircraft are anachronistic for the given timeframe. Nevertheless, the story became very popular and was widely reprinted. By 1942, however, at least two publications had retracted the story.

Inquiries to New Eden about the article were referred to Benjamin F. Allen, the source for the story. However, Allen had not intended for the story to be published until it could be corroborated, and he resented the embellishments Gurley had added. In October 1945 he described the version of the story he told to Gurley, writing: "In conversation with him I had given him the few details originating from two soldiers in the Czarist Russian army during the First World War, deceased many years ago. The story by these soldiers came to me from their relatives of how a Russian aviator had sighted a suspicious looking structure in one of Ararat's obscure canyons. Infantrymen were sent on foot to investigate and their officers and they decided it must be Noah's Ark, with one end sunk in a small swamp. These were the only details they gave." Allen said that "95%" of the New Eden article, including the name "Vladimir Roskovitsky", had been fabricated by Gurley, who issued an apology at his request.

Despite Gurley's retraction, interest in the Russian aviator story persisted, as attention turned to verifying Allen's version. Real estate agent Eryl Cummings, who learned of the Roskovitsky story in 1945, was particularly inspired to investigate the possibility that Noah's Ark had been discovered. In November 1945 he founded the Sacred History Research Expedition for the purpose of investigating the matter, and through his research he later came to be considered "the dean of American ark hunters."

Cummings discovered a new lead in an article from the 6 October 1945 issue of the Russian-language magazine Rosseya, which was similar to Gurley's Roskovitsky account. The Rosseya article, written by former Russian officer Alexander A. Koor, placed the tsar's expedition in December 1917, and described the Ark as measuring 500 feet (150 m) long, 83 feet (25 m) wide, and 50 feet (15 m) high. Koor's version ended with a rumor that the expedition's report was intercepted by Leon Trotsky, who had the courier shot. Cummings later contacted Koor, who said he had served in the Ararat region in 1915, and heard of the Ark expedition from fellow officers he met in 1921. This was enough to convince Cummings that Koor had not simply plagiarized the New Eden article. An amateur archaeologist, Koor also claimed to have discovered cuneiform inscriptions at Ararat describing the story of the Flood. Following his correspondence with Cummings, Koor would take an interest in promoting the discredited Book of Veles.

=== Aaron J. Smith ===
In November 1948, Edwin Greenwald reported for the Associated Press that Kurdish villagers had discovered a large, petrified wooden ship on Mount Ararat. Shukra Asena, who owned land in the area, reported to Greenwald that a farmer named Reshit found the ship's prow in September, about two-thirds of the way up the mountain. Asena claimed that Reshit spread word of his discovery, and people from many of the local villages had climbed Ararat to view the object.

Although the article was largely secondhand hearsay, British amateur archaeologist Egerton Sykes hoped to organize an expedition to establish that Reshit's discovery was in fact Noah's Ark. Aaron J. Smith, dean of the People's Bible College in North Carolina, joined Sykes in preparing for the operation. The pair received publicity when Pravda accused them of planning a surveillance operation for "Anglo-American imperialists", citing the proximity of Mount Ararat to the Soviet border. When Sykes was unable to proceed due to a lack of funding, Smith went on without him.

Upon arrival in Turkey, the expedition spent two months in Istanbul, arranging all of the permits necessary to proceed to Ararat. Following this delay, Greenwald joined Smith's party, which planned to hire Reshit as a guide. However, Reshit could not be located, despite the offer of a reward for information. Although Greenwald's article had indicated that Reshit's find had been witnessed by people throughout the area, no such witnesses could be found by the team.

Although the mission ended in failure, Smith remained hopeful that Noah's Ark would be found on Ararat someday. Expedition member Necati Dolunay argued that the project "has done a great deal for science and research as regards the ark. It finally has utterly disproved opinions and observations during more than 100 years that the ark is in plain sight."

In 1986, David Fasold interviewed a man named Ali Oğlu Reșit Sarihan, whom he believed to be the Reshit described by Shukra Asena thirty-eight years earlier. According to Fasold, the object that Reshit allegedly discovered in 1948 was not located on Mount Ararat as originally reported, but was in fact the Durupınar site.

=== Haji Yearam ===
Harold Williams, a Seventh-Day Adventist pastor, related the story of Haji Yearam in a 1952 letter to Ark researcher Eryl Cummings. Over the next few years, Eryl and his wife Violet worked to corroborate the story, locating Yearam's death certificate in 1956 and securing Williams's permission, in 1958, to publish his letters. It is unclear if the story was widely circulated until the 1970s, when Violet Cummings began writing books about the Ark.

Yearam was a devout Seventh-Day Adventist who had immigrated from Armenia to the United States, eventually settling in Oakland, California. In 1915, Harold Williams and his parents began caring for the elderly, ailing Yearam. "Haji asked me to [...] write down carefully a story he was very anxious to tell," Williams wrote, "because he was sure that it would be of use some day after he was dead and gone." According to Williams, this deathbed statement revealed that Yearam, as a boy, had been part of a secret expedition that located Noah's Ark on Mount Ararat. The exact timeframe of this alleged expedition is uncertain, though Violet Cummings concludes that it occurred circa 1856.

In Yearam's story, as related by Williams, his home village was at the foot of Mount Ararat, and his community had once made regular pilgrimages up to the Ark. One day "three vile men who did not believe the Bible" hired Yearam and his father as guides, as they intended to search the mountain in order to disprove the Noah's Ark story. When Yearam's father led them to the Ark, the three scientists "went into a Satanic rage at finding what they hoped to prove nonexistent." After trying and failing to destroy the vessel, the scientists agreed to cover up the discovery and made Yearam and his father swear to keep the secret under threat of torture and murder. Williams later explained that Yearam "wanted his story preserved so that when the right time came it might encourage brave men to go and locate the Ark and give to the world such proof as could not be denied"

Haji Yearam died on 3 May 1920. Williams claimed that, around that same time, he read a newspaper article about a scientist in London who gave a deathbed confession about concealing the discovery of Noah's Ark. This second account was supposed to be remarkably consistent with the statement Yearam had given. Williams said that he saved the newspaper, keeping it with his transcript of Yearam's story; however, both were destroyed in a 1940 house fire. Despite a diligent search, no copy of the article about the dying scientist has ever been located.

The chief criticism of Williams's account is that it is entirely hearsay evidence. Williams is the sole source for a story he considered to be very important in 1920, yet he made no effort to share it before the destruction of his evidence twenty years later, and no effort to publish it until the 1950s. The motivations of the story's scientists make no sense except to conform to their villainous role in what Larry Eskridge characterizes as a "melodrama". The TalkOrigins Archive suggests that the depiction of unbelievers, indicates that the entire story was manufactured as religious propaganda.

=== Fernand Navarra ===
French industrialist Fernand Navarra claimed to have located Noah's Ark in his 1956 book J'ai Trouvé l'Arche de Noé. According to Navarra, he was inspired to search for the ship in 1937, after listening to an Armenian friend describe the legends his grandfather had told him in 1920. In 1952, he was invited to join an Ararat expedition with Jean de Riquer and Sehap Atalay, which reported no sign of the Ark. However, Navarra would later claim that, while alone, he sighted a large, dark mass that he said could only be the Ark. Since he could not reach this object or provide proof for its existence, he decided not to reveal his discovery until he could return.

After failing to return to the site in 1953, Navarra resolved to return in 1955. For his next attempt, he sought to avoid potential delays caused by securing permission from the Turkish authorities to climb Ararat. To that end, he disguised the mission as a family vacation, bringing his wife and three sons to Turkey and scaling the mountain with eleven-year-old Raphael Navarra. The father and son filmed their recovery of a 5-foot (1.5 m) beam of hand-hewn wood, which Fernand said was cut from the structure he located in 1952. To make the wood easier to carry without arousing suspicion from the Turks, they cut the beam into smaller pieces.

In 1956 Navarra submitted his wood to several institutions for scientific analysis. The wood was identified as oak. Analyses based on color, density, and lignitization reportedly indicated the wood was about 5,000 years old, in line with the literalist timeframe of the Flood. However, these methodologies for dating wood are unreliable, and rejected by most scientists. Personal correspondence from 1959 refers to an unknown report that Navarra's wood had been radiocarbon dated to exactly 4,484 years old. Such a precise figure is not possible to obtain from radiocarbon dating, and does not correspond to any biblical chronology except that of Navarra, who wrote in 1955 that the Flood occurred "4,484 years ago."

The Archaeological Research Foundation conducted several expeditions to locate Navarra's site in the 1960s, but were unable to find it. Acting as a consultant, Navarra supplied maps which ARF found vague and inconsistent with the mountain. In negotiations for him to personally lead ARF to the site, Navarra demanded considerable financial compensation and royalties from whatever the team might find. The two sides came to an agreement for a 1968 mission, in which Navarra arrived late and injured his foot while attempting to catch up. By 1969 the efforts of ARF had been taken over by a new organization, the SEARCH Foundation, led by Ralph Crawford and with Navarra serving on the board of directors. On a SEARCH expedition in 1969, Navarra became separated from the rest of the party and, shortly thereafter, identified a site where the team found pieces of wood.

SEARCH board member Elfred Lee arranged for radiocarbon dating on samples from Navarra's specimens. The 1955 samples were analyzed by five institutions, with results dating the wood to approximately 1,200-1,700 years ago. Two analyses of the 1969 samples dated the wood to about 1,350 years ago. In 1984, Navarra gave another piece of wood to James Irwin, who submitted it for another round of tests. Irwin's sample was found to be about 1500 years old, with evidence that the pitch coating was of far more recent origin, and applied using modern technology.

Several allegations have cast doubt on Navarra's credibility. Although Navarra said in 1958 that Sehap Atalay had collected wood from the Navarra site, Atalay contradicted that claim in 1962. According to Atalay, Navarra gave him the wood on his way back from the 1955 expedition. In 1970, Jean de Riquer accused Navarra of attempting to buy ancient wood from villagers at the foot of Ararat during their 1952 expedition. During his own ascents of Ararat, Gunnar Smars met Kurdish guides who accompanied Navarra on one or more private climbs around 1968 or 1969, unbeknownst to SEARCH.

=== Durupınar site ===
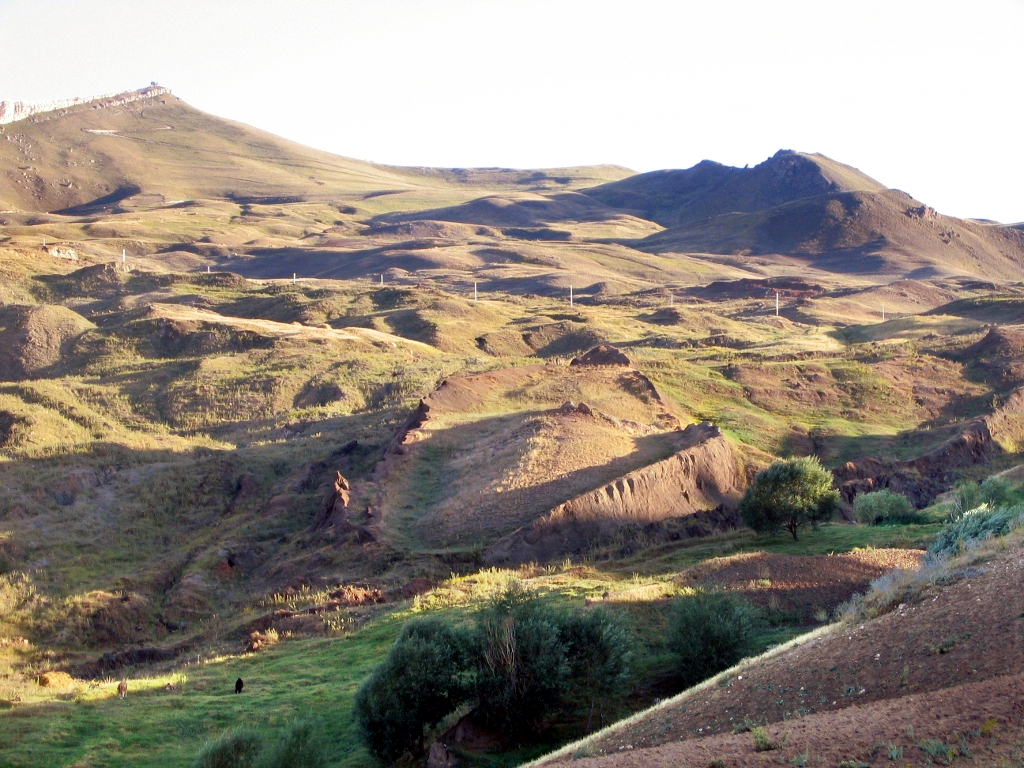
The Durupınar site, Agri, Turkey

During a 1959 geodetic survey of Turkey, an anomalous shape near Doğubayazıt was identified by İlhan Durupınar of the Turkish Air Force and Sevket Kurtis of Ohio State University. The size and shape of the object resemble a boat approximately 450 feet (140 m) long and 150 feet (46 m) wide, inviting speculation that it could be Noah's Ark. Evangelist George Vandeman organized an expedition to the site in 1960, which determined that the shape was a natural geological formation.

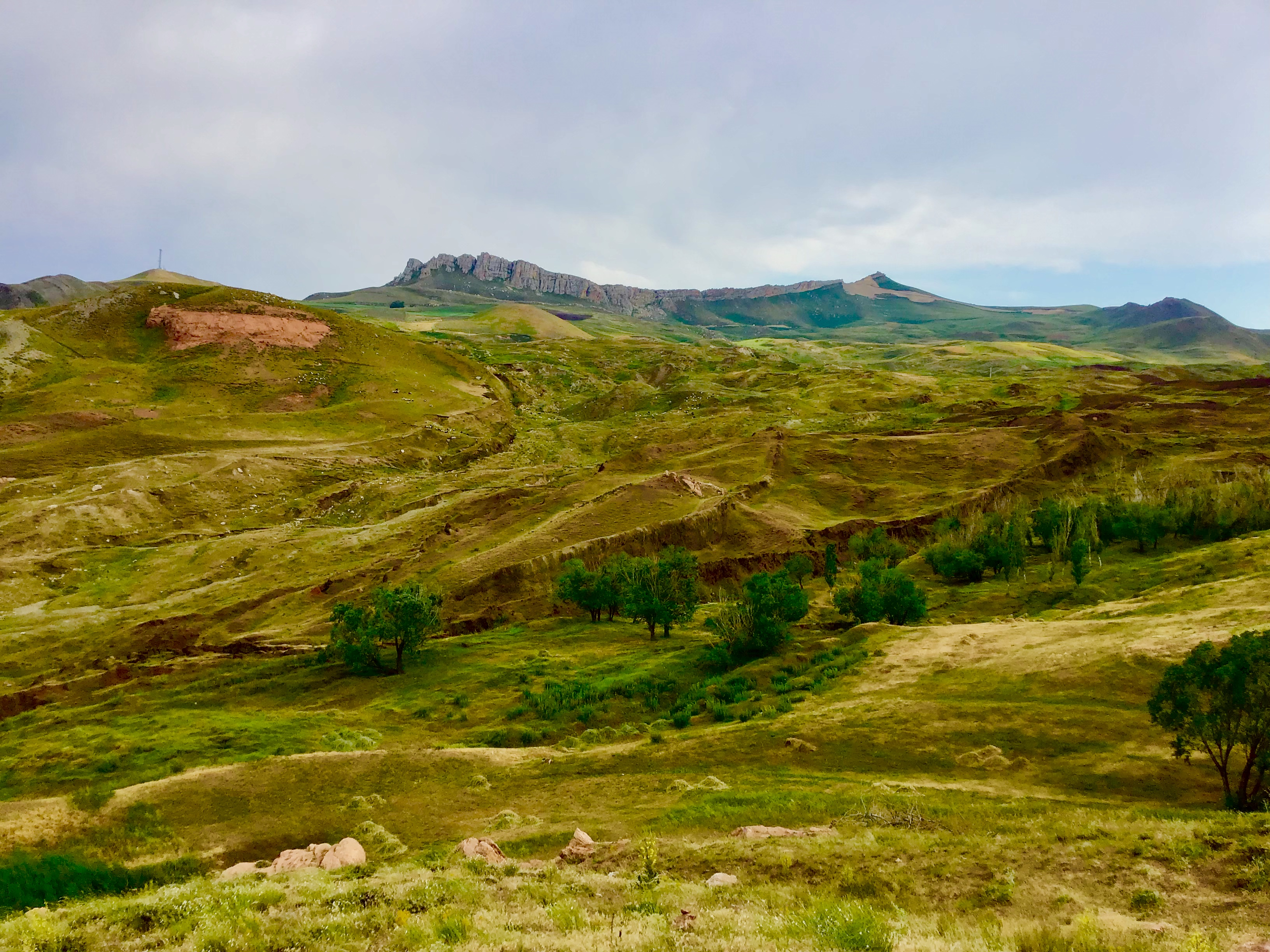
The Durupinar site in July 2019

Interest in the site was renewed by Ron Wyatt, who visited the site in 1977, 1979, and 1984. Based on Wyatt's promotion of his research, the Turkish government declared the site a national park in 1986. Geophysicist John Baumgardner and salvage expert David Fasold strongly advocated that the site was in fact Noah's Ark, but both of them eventually broke with Wyatt to express misgivings about their findings. In 1996, Fasold co-authored a paper with geologist Lorence G. Collins, asserting that the site "cannot have been Noah's Ark nor even a man-made model."

=== George Greene ===
In the mid-1960s, oil engineer Fred Drake claimed to have seen six photographs of Noah's Ark in 1954. According to Drake, the photos were taken by his colleague George Greene, who had taken a helicopter flight around Mount Ararat while working at a Turkish oil pipeline. The pictures showed an unidentified protrusion on the mountain, resembling the prow of a large wooden ship. An investigation by the Archeological Research Foundation determined that Greene tried and failed to organize an expedition to Ararat, and then relocated to British Guiana, where he died in 1962. Greene's friends and family were uncertain what became of his Ararat photos, which were never found.

A 1990 article by Bill Crouse listed various natural formations on Ararat that appeared to resemble a ship in photographs until mountaineers examined them in person. Crouse believed one of these "phantom arks", a prow-shaped chunk of basalt photographed by Tom Crotser in the 1970s, could be the same object seen by Greene.

=== Georgie Hagopian ===
In 1970, Armenian-American Georgie Hagopian reported that his uncle took him to see Noah's Ark twice during his childhood. Different accounts of his story place the first sighting in 1902, 1906, or 1908, with the second incident occurring about two years later. According to this account, the moss-covered Ark lay on the edge of a cliff, so that only one side was accessible. Hagopian said that many other boys in his childhood community told him that they had seen the structure. The TalkOrigins Archive takes issue with the "apparent ease" with which these children supposedly reached the Ark site, in contrast with the difficulties reported by other explorers.

By Hagopian's estimate, the Ark was over 1,000 feet (300 m) long, 600–700 feet (180–210 m) wide, and over 35 feet (11 m) high. To reconcile this estimate with traditional interpretations of the Ark's size, John Warwick Montgomery suggested that "Dimensions regularly appear greater than they actually are to small children." However, Hagopian's recollection of an 18-inch (46 cm) window (which is consistent with traditional views) is accepted as a precise estimate by Violet Cummings.

Hagopian said that his uncle wanted to keep a piece of the Ark, but was unable to cut into the wood using a knife or a blast of gunpowder. He adamantly rejected Fernand Navarra's claim to have found fragments of the Ark. Attempting to reconcile the two claims, Montgomery raised the possibility that the Ark was "not uniformly petrified." Hagopian, however, believed the entire structure was "absolutely petrified," and that "Almighty God would never permit the Ark to be cut and broken up."

=== James Irwin ===
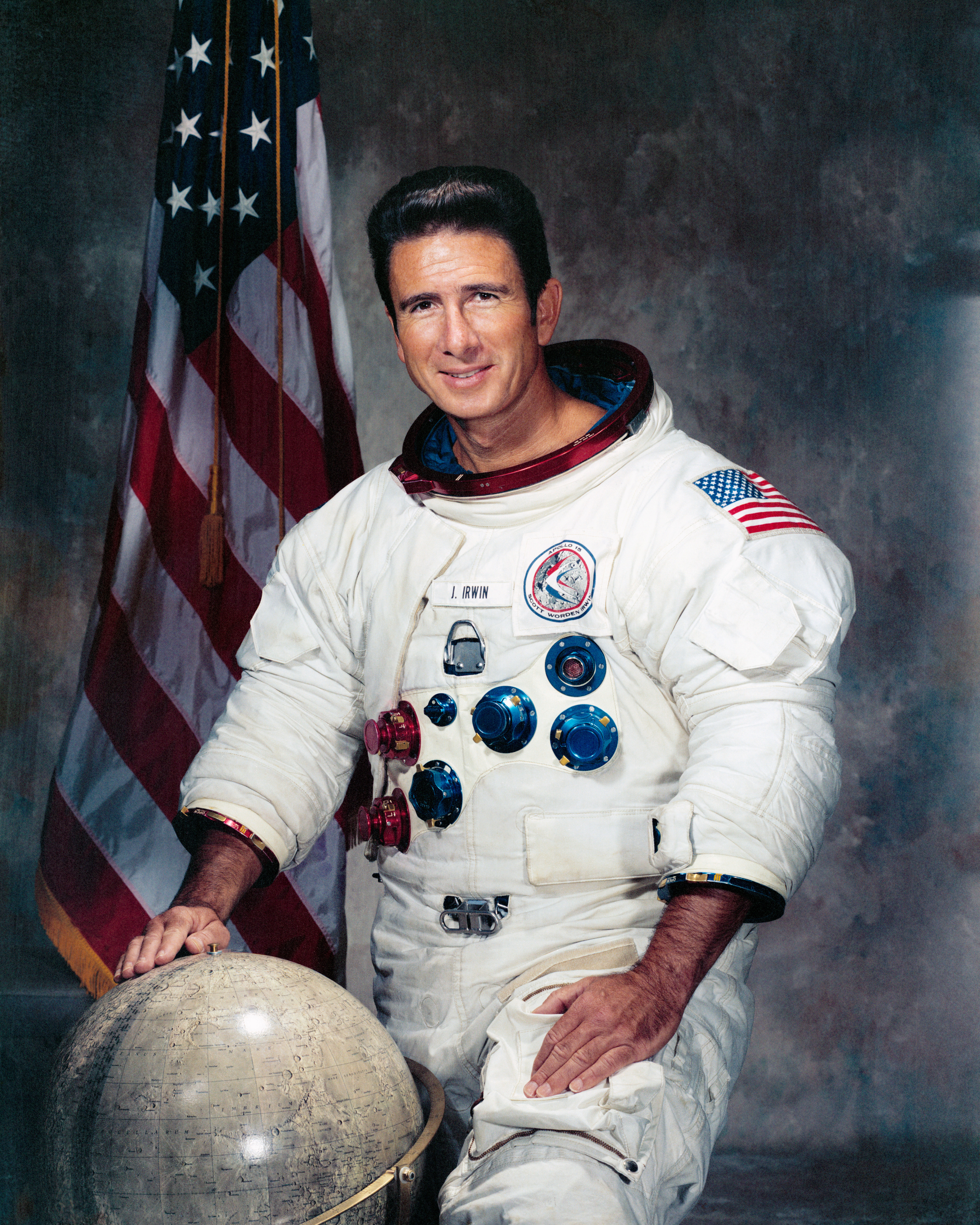
James Irwin

Astronaut James Irwin, the eighth person to walk on the Moon, experienced a religious epiphany during the Apollo 15 mission in 1971. The following year, he resigned from NASA and founded an evangelical organization, the High Flight Foundation. During his outreach work, Irwin met Eryl Cummings in 1976 and expressed interest in joining one of his expeditions in search of Noah's Ark. At the time, Turkish policy had closed off Mount Ararat to explorers, and Irwin was denied a permit in 1977. However, following the 1980 coup Irwin's celebrity allowed him to establish a rapport with President Kenan Evren, who invited him to lead an expedition in 1982.

Irwin's 1982 mission ended in disaster when he left the group, in search of a shortcut to the summit, and fell off the trail. He had no memory of what caused the fall, but later speculated that he'd been caught in a rockslide and struck by a rock. He awoke hours later, badly wounded, and crawled into his sleeping bag to survive the night. The expedition team sent out a search party the following day, which rescued him and brought him down the mountain for medical treatment.

Undeterred, Irwin returned to Ararat a month later, this time with his wife and son. He hoped to pursue a tip offered to him by another explorer, who reported seeing an object about 12,000 feet (3,700 m) up the mountain in Ahora Gorge. Mary Irwin later expressed misgivings about her husband's mental state so soon after his fall. "Because Jim’s rationale wasn’t quite right after being hit so hard on his head," she wrote in 2012, "he deduced we wouldn’t need backpacks and climbing gear." Without proper equipment, the team struggled to make progress during the night, and were forced to abandon the expedition.

In August 1983, Irwin made another attempt, partnering with Marvin Steffins. They chartered an airplane to survey Ararat, and led a 22-member expedition, including Eryl Cummings and several members of Irwin's family. During the climb, a Turkish guide had sighted wood where the snowline had receded. A blizzard forced the team to turn back before they could reach the site. "It's easier to walk on the moon," Irwin said, regarding the difficulties in climbing Ararat. "I've done all I possibly can, but the ark continues to elude us."

Irwin fully intended to try again in 1984. However, he acknowledged the possibility that the Ark might not be found. Although he firmly believed the ship had really existed, he was far less certain that it had not been destroyed over the centuries. "The likelihood of it surviving at all," he said, "is small." He also suspected that many of the reported sightings on Mount Ararat were false. Nevertheless, he scaled the mountain that summer to look for the wood sighted the previous year. When he reached the site, he found only a pair of abandoned skis.

During the 1985 climbing season, Kurdish rebels had ambushed at least four parties on Ararat. By the time Irwin could begin his climb on 24 August, only five of his 22-member party were allowed to accompany him, and the expedition was escorted by thirty Turkish soldiers. Just as the team reached the summit, Turkish officials ordered them to descend. By the time the party received permission to resume the mission, they were too exhausted to continue. According to the US Ambassador to Turkey, Robert Strausz-Hupé, the government was reacting to Soviet maneuvers near the border, and concern that Irwin would become a high value target for terrorists.

Irwin planned to make a sixth trip to Ararat in July 1986, with a smaller team. These plans were disrupted when he suffered arrhythmia on 6 June. By July, however, he had resumed plans for the expedition. "My doctor is against my traveling, and he said that I cannot go over 10,000 feet," Irwin said. "But the Lord willing, I will be there." After completing an aerial survey of Ararat, Irwin's team was detained at their hotel, under accusations of violating Soviet and Iranian airspace. The party was released once local officials confirmed Irwin's flight had been authorized. According to expedition member Bob Cornuke, Irwin expressed concern that his fame attracted media attention and security risks that were hampering the search. "Jim himself had confided on our last trip, as the permit process reached new heights of lunacy, that the problems could be traced to him, not (as some had come to suspect) a sinister Turkish plot to prevent us from finding the ark." In September, Irwin announced "I think I’ve done all I can to attract attention to the ark. I think it is time others take up the search."

A 1987 heat wave in Turkey convinced Irwin to change his mind and return for his seventh expedition to Mount Ararat. He believed the warm temperatures might have melted enough of the mountain's glaciers to make Noah's Ark easier to spot from the air. Irwin's High Flight Foundation teamed with the Institute for Creation Research, Evangelische Omroep, and International Exploration, Inc. for a joint operation. According to ICR's John D. Morris, the Turkish government had banned exploration of Ararat earlier in the year, and only approved this expedition on the condition that the team also evaluate the Durupınar site. Permits to explore Ararat itself were revoked before the party could begin its intended mission. Ultimately the expedition was only able to arrange a high-altitude aerial survey, staying no less than 20 kilometres (12 mi) from Soviet and Iranian airspace.

The 1987 expedition would be Irwin's last, as doctors ordered him to give up the search. When the High Flight Foundation organized another trip in 1988, Bob Cornuke led the party while Irwin stayed home.

=== Ed Davis ===
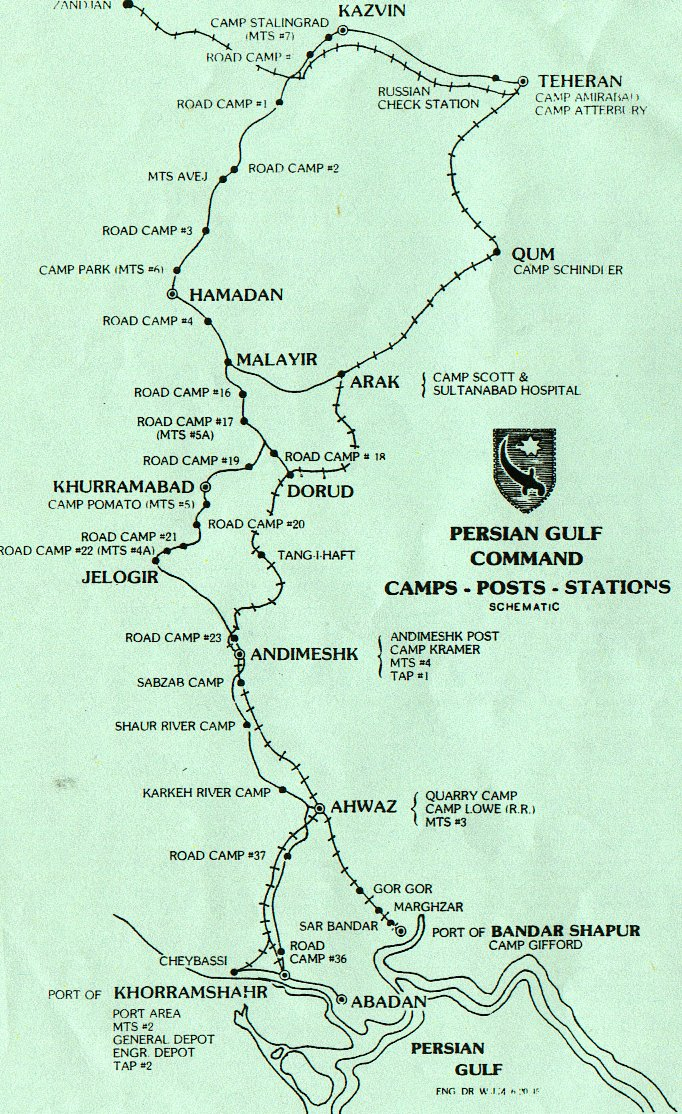
Persian Gulf Command, where Davis was stationed in 1943

Optometrist and Ararat explorer Don Shockey learned in 1985 that Ed Davis had spoken to his church about seeing Noah's Ark during World War II. Shockey invited Davis to speak at an "ark-a-thon" convention he organized in 1986 at Farmington, New Mexico. Davis was interviewed extensively about his story by Shockey's FIBER organization, and later subjected to a polygraph test on behalf of James Irwin's High Flight Foundation.

In 1943 Davis was a sergeant in the United States Army Corps of Engineers, stationed in Hamadan to work on the Persian Corridor between Khorramshahr and Qazvin. According to Davis, during this assignment he befriended a local driver named Badi, and his father Abas-Abas, who claimed to have visited Noah's Ark atop the mountain near their village. Around 1 July, Abas-Abas invited Davis to join them in one such visit, saying that enough snow and ice had melted to partially expose the ship. Upon reaching "Doomsday Point", Davis said he saw the Ark, which "first appeared as a huge rock formation covered by fog." It was lying in a cove lake, within a canyon below his position, and broken into two portions. Abas-Abas claimed that the Ark had been whole in his youth, and had only broken apart within his lifetime.

Ark researchers disagree about whether Davis's experience involved Mount Ararat in Turkey's Ağrı Province. Davis said the mountain he visited could be seen from his unit's base in Hamadan, but Ağrı is 400 miles (640 km) away. The first published version of his account describes Badi and Abas-Abas as Kurds, which is consistent with a story about visiting a village in Ağrı. However, in footage of his original interview Davis says the villagers were Lurs, an ethnic group in western Iran. Several different mountains in Lorestan are identified by the Lurs as the landing site of Noah's Ark. Similarly, Lur tradition places the Garden of Eden, which Davis also reported seeing, in Lorestan.

=== George Jammal hoax ===
In November 1985, actor George Jammal wrote to Duane Gish, vice-president of the Institute for Creation Research, falsely claiming to have searched for Noah's Ark between 1972 and 1984. Jammal described being aided by "Mr. Asholian", "Alis Buls Hitian", and "Vladimir Sobitchsky". The story culminated with Jammal and Vladimir locating the Ark in a cave of ice, whereupon Vladimir fell to his death trying to photograph the ship. Jammal also claimed to have taken a piece of wood from the site.

ICR's John D. Morris responded to Jammal in 1986, seeking to arrange an interview. Jammal prepared by studying books about the search for the Ark, as well as the 1976 Sun Classic Pictures film In Search of Noah's Ark. During the interview, Jammal used cold reading techniques to elicit information from Morris that would determine Jammal's answers to Morris's questions. According to Jammal, Morris repeatedly offered to finance an expedition to corroborate his story.

Years later, when Sun began work on a follow-up to In Search of Noah's Ark, Morris shared his information on Jammal. David Balsiger, researching the story for Sun, was advised by Ark researchers David Fasold and Bill Crouse that Jammal's account was not credible. Unsure whether to perpetuate the hoax, Jammal contacted noted skeptic Gerald A. Larue, who described how he felt misrepresented by Sun's 1992 TV-movie Ancient Secrets of the Bible. On 20 February 1993, CBS aired Sun's The Incredible Discovery of Noah's Ark, which featured a segment on Jammal's story and showed him displaying a piece of wood purportedly taken from the Ark. Larue issued a press release exposing the hoax, which was largely ignored until Time covered the story in July.

Following the exposure of the hoax, Jammal was initially reluctant to comment for fear of legal reprisal. However, in October 1993 he admitted that he made up the entire story. The wood he presented on-screen had in fact been pine found near some railroad tracks in Long Beach, California, which he boiled with spices and baked in an oven. Jammal was critical of Sun's failure to verify his story. "I even gave the production company a piece of the wood to test," he wrote, "but they obviously weren't interested in truth; all they wanted was a good performance. If they had actually been concerned about truth, they should have asked me why Noah's Ark smelled like teriyaki sauce!" A representative for Sun stated that Jammal's segment would be edited from future releases of The Incredible Discovery of Noah's Ark.

== 21st century ==
=== Daniel McGivern ===
Honolulu businessman Daniel McGivern began investigating the search for Noah's Ark in 1995, and eventually financed commercial satellite photos of Mount Ararat. According to his research, a 2003 heat wave melted enough ice and snow on the northwestern slope to reveal a dark patch, which he interpreted as resembling three beams and a crossbeam. In April 2004, McGivern and Turkish mountaineer Ahmet Ali Arslan announced plans for an expedition to the site in July. A Guardian article associated McGivern's site with the Ararat anomaly, a similar phenomenon observed in surveillance photos of Mount Ararat declassified by the US government in the 1990s.

Although McGivern hoped to begin the expedition by 15 July, he instead spent the entire summer trying to obtain approval from the Turkish government. His request was finally declined in September. Critics suggested that McGivern announced the expedition before obtaining permission as a publicity stunt to persuade Turkey to authorize it. The choice of Arslan, who claimed in 1989 to have photographed Noah's Ark, to lead the mission was also questioned. "Ahmet is a big talker," according to an ark researcher commenting to National Geographic. "In one conversation he will say that he has 3,000 photos, and in another conversation ten minutes later 5,000 photos."

McGivern said he would not make another attempt the following year. "I don't have Ark fever like many who go year after year," he said. "A good businessman calculates what amount of money and time he will invest and has to know when to walk away." However, in 2011 he said he had funded other, smaller expeditions, and had spent $500,000 on research.

=== Bob Cornuke ===
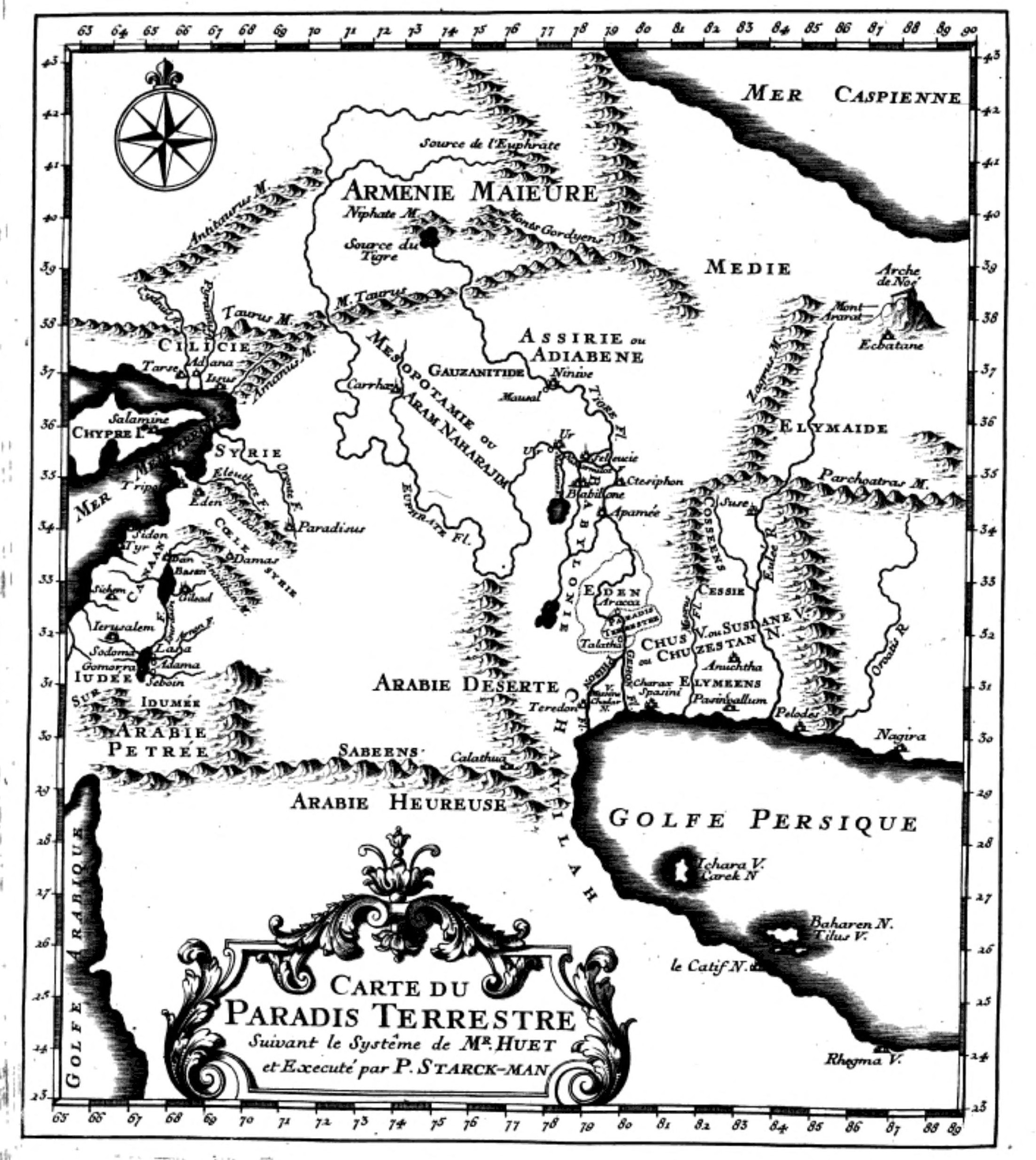
1722 map depicting Noah's Ark at Ecbatana, in what is now western Iran

During an unsuccessful expedition in 1988, Bob Cornuke became convinced that Noah's Ark could not be on Mount Ararat. He gave up the search, forming the Bible Archeology Search and Exploration Institute in 1992 to seek out other biblical locations and artifacts. However, in 1998 Cornuke learned of the idea that Genesis 11:2 places the Ark's landing site east of Shinar. In this context he reevaluated the testimony of Ed Davis, and concluded that the site Davis described must be in Iran.

In June 2006, the BASE Institute announced the discovery of a large object resembling petrified wood on Mount Takht-e Suleyman in the Alborz. The object, located 13,000 feet (4,000 m) above sea level, was reported to be similar in size to estimates for the Ark. The BASE website asserted that this object was the same one Ed Davis claimed to have seen, but stopped short of proclaiming it Noah's Ark, instead calling it "a candidate." "I think we've found something that deserves a lot more research," Cornuke said. "It has a distinct possibility that it could be something like the ark."

Critics of the announcement objected to the lack of peer review on Cornuke's findings. Looking at the expedition's photos, experts in geology and ancient timber disputed the possibility that the object was petrified wood. The expedition included many "business, law, and ministry leaders," but no professional geologists or archaeologists. Cornuke's interpretation of scripture was also criticized, as Genesis does not indicate whether Noah's descendants migrated to Shinar directly from Ararat, or from some unnamed intermediate location. Moreover, Genesis 11:2 can be plausibly translated to indicate that the clan migrated eastward, suggesting a point of origin west of Shinar.

By 2010, Cornuke had stopped looking for Noah's Ark, saying "I came down (from the mountain) with all this evidence for Noah’s Ark, and nobody cared." In 2012 he wrote "In all my 25 years of searching for the ark I have never seen the old boat."

=== Noah's Ark Ministries International ===
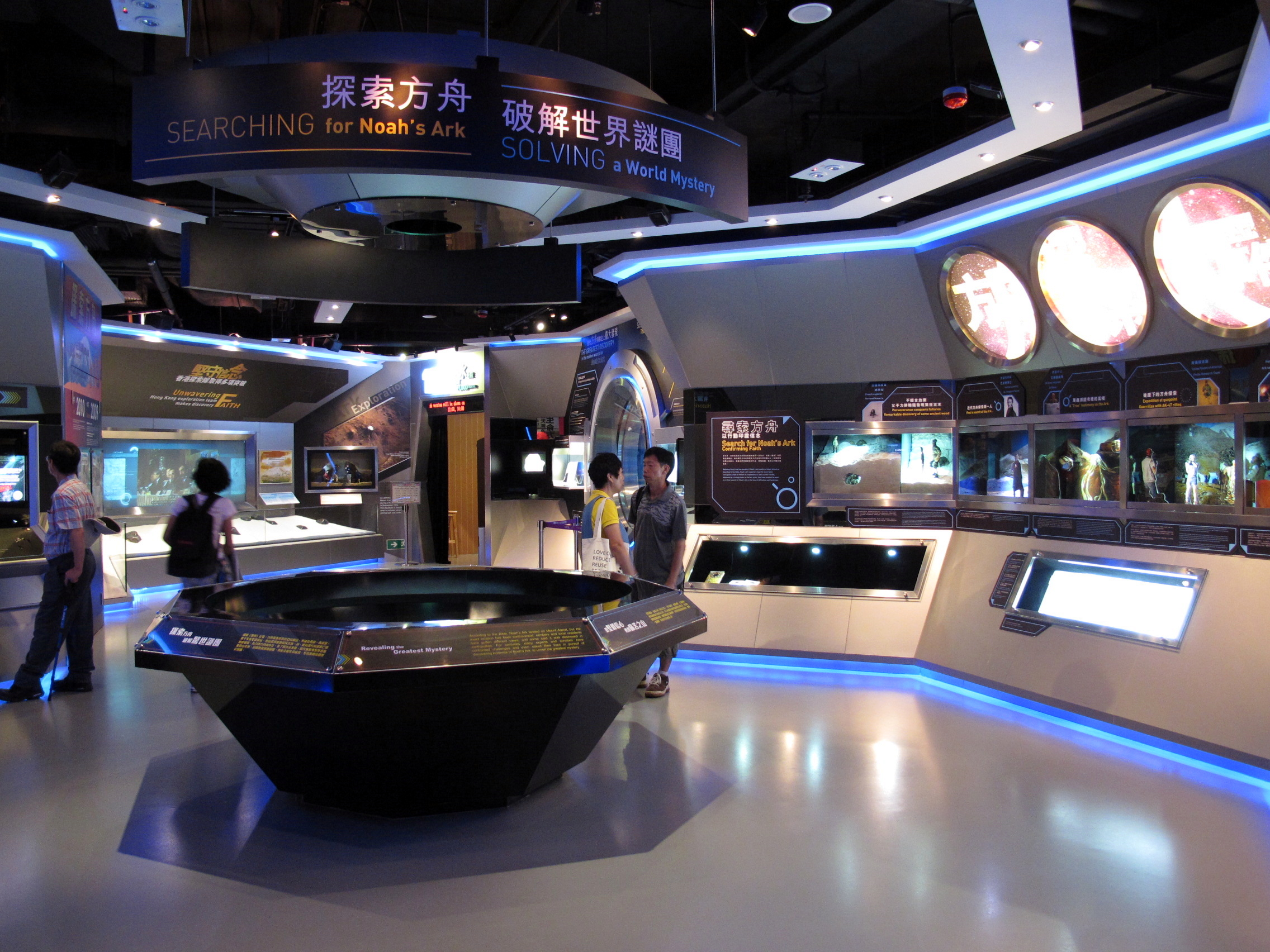
Exhibit on the search for Noah's Ark at the Noah's Ark theme park in Hong Kong

In 2004, Media Evangelism founder Andrew Yuen Man-fai and pastor Boaz Li Chi-kwong announced the discovery of parts of Noah's Ark on Mount Ararat. They reported that their team found a large wooden structure at an elevation of 4,200 metres (13,800 ft) during their fourth trip to the mountain. According to an exhibit at Hong Kong's Noah's Ark theme park, the search team had been exploring Ararat as Noah's Ark Ministries International (NAMI) since 2003. Yuen and Li had no evidence of their claim beyond blurred images, as they said a "mysterious force" disrupted their video footage. In 2005, Media Evangelism released a documentary, The Days of Noah, based on the NAMI expedition.

According to NAMI's website, Turkish mountaineer Ahmet Ertuğrul (nicknamed "Paraşut") submitted a sample of petrified wood to NAMI, which he claimed to have obtained in August 2006 from a second wooden structure, located 4,000 metres (13,000 ft) up Mount Ararat. NAMI claimed that an expedition was sent in February 2007, which found that the 2004 site had collapsed due to an earthquake, and was prevented from examining the 2006 site due to weather conditions. An October 2007 press conference announced that a follow-up mission in August successfully recovered more petrified wood from the site Ertuğrul reported.

In a press conference on 25 April 2010, NAMI announced that an October 2009 expedition had excavated and filmed the wood structure discovered by Ertuğrul. Although NAMI's website claimed Ertuğrul discovered the site in August 2006, he stated at the press conference that he learned of it in June 2008. The wooden structure reported by Yuen and Li in 2004 was not addressed. According to NAMI, specimens from the site were carbon-dated to 4800 BP. Footage of the interior of the structure was released on NAMI's YouTube account. NAMI said that Turkey would submit the location for designation as a World Heritage Site; however, when reached for comment a spokesperson for UNESCO said that the organization had not received such a request.

The immediate response to the announcement was largely skeptical. Mainstream scientists objected to the lack of professional archaeologists involved with the research, and the decision to reveal the findings via a media event rather than publishing a peer-reviewed study. Creationists also expressed concern about the lack of data available for independent corroboration. Andrew A. Snelling later said that NAMI supplied him with their radiocarbon dating report, which showed that only one test of one sample had produced the publicized result of 4800 BP. Moreover, Snelling rejected the 4800 BP result as evidence for Noah's Ark, based on creationist beliefs about carbon-14 levels in antediluvian wood. Turkey's Ministry of Culture and Tourism expressed doubt that NAMI secured permission to conduct their expeditions, and began an investigation as to how NAMI transported its wood samples from Turkey to China.

Within days of the announcement, Randall Price, who had consulted with NAMI in 2008, came forward with allegations that Ertuğrul hired Kurdish workers to construct the site using wood from an old structure near the Black Sea. NAMI issued a statement saying that its relationship with Price ended in October 2008, and he was therefore unfamiliar with findings made after that time. Defending NAMI's claims, team members argued that it would not be possible to haul enough materials up Mount Ararat to build the structure that they had described. In rebuttal, Price and his colleague Don Patton cited the use of heavy equipment in other Ararat expeditions, as well as a 2007 publicity stunt in which Greenpeace built a 10-metre (33 ft) replica of Noah's Ark on the mountain.

After promoting the release of the 2011 film The Days of Noah 2: Apocalypse, the NAMI website NoahsArkSearch.net was no longer updated. Support for NAMI's claims was later taken up by Norman Geisler, who invited Ertuğrul to speak at an apologetics conference organized by Southern Evangelical Seminary in October 2015. Joel Klenck, formerly associated with NAMI, has continued to promote NAMI's claims as recently as December 2020.

NAMI and Ertuğrul never disclosed the location of the site they reported, although Price and Patton claimed in 2010 to have independently located it. Donald Mackenzie, a self-styled missionary who had searched for Noah's Ark for nearly a decade, traveled to Ararat in 2010 hoping to find Ertuğrul's site on his own. Mackenzie contacted his family from the mountain in September, but was never heard from again. His abandoned campsite was later found, but the circumstances of his disappearance remain unknown.

== Conflicting opinions ==
Modern organized searches for the ark tend to originate in American evangelical circles. According to Larry Eskridge,

An interesting phenomenon that has arisen within twentieth-century conservative American evangelism – the widespread conviction that the ancient Ark of Noah is embedded in ice high atop Mount Ararat, waiting to be found. It is a story that has combined earnest faith with the lure of adventure, questionable evidence with startling claims. The hunt for the ark, like evangelism itself, is a complex blend of the rational and the supernatural, the modern and the premodern. While it acknowledges a debt to pure faith in a literal reading of the Scriptures and centuries of legend, the conviction that the Ark literally lies on Ararat is a recent one, backed by a largely twentieth-century canon of evidence that includes stories of shadowy eyewitnesses, tales of mysterious missing photographs, rumors of atheistic conspiracy, and pieces of questionable "ark wood" from the mountain. (...) Moreover, it skirts the domain of pop pseudoscience and the paranormal, making the attempt to find the ark the evangelical equivalent of the search for Bigfoot or the Loch Ness monster. In all these ways, it reveals much about evangelicals' distrust of mainstream science and the motivations and modus operandi of the scientific elite.

Ark-seeker Richard Carl Bright considers the search for the ark a religious quest, dependent on God's blessing for its success. Bright is also confident that there is a multinational government conspiracy to hide the "truth" about the ark:

I firmly believe that the governments of Turkey, Russia, and the United States know exactly where the ark sits. They suppress the information, but (...) God is in charge. The structure will be revealed in its time. We climb the mountain and search, hoping it is, in fact, God's time as we climb. Use us, O Lord, is our prayer.

== See also ==
- Archaeological forgery
- Biblical archeology
- Biblical literalism
- Creationism
- Flood myth
- Flood geology
- In Search of Noah's Ark
- List of topics characterized as pseudoscience
