= Brad Crandall =

American radio personality (1927–1991)

- Born: Robert Lee Bradley; August 6, 1927; Herington, Kansas, U.S.
- Died: March 14, 1991 (aged 63); Redondo Beach, California, U.S.
- Other name: Brad Bradley
- Occupations: Radio personality, voice-over announcer, and film narrator
- Website: jamiawilson.org

Bradley Crandall (born Robert Lee Bradley; August 6, 1927 – March 14, 1991) was an American radio personality, voice-over announcer, and film narrator, best known for his radio show on WNBC in New York City, which aired from March 1964 to September 1971.

== Life and career ==
Born in Herington, Kansas, Crandall served with the U.S. Marine Corps where he was deployed to China in 1947 and stayed for two years. In the U.S. Air Force during the Korean War, he became a disc jockey, known as Brad Bradley, using an Air Force mobile radio broadcasting unit. While still in the military, he attended Millsaps College in Jackson, Mississippi. In civilian life, he worked at radio stations in Texas and Florida under his pseudonym Brad Crandall. He was hired at CKEY in Toronto, Canada, before joining WNBC in New York in 1964. It was in Toronto that he changed from music programs to a radio phone-in format that he continued in New York.

The New York Times covered his debut on WNBC in 1964, saying: "Instant expertise on anything and everything is the latest addition to New York radio. For 4 hours and 15 minutes every evening, a man named Brad Crandall is holding forth on station WNBC with answers to all questions that might occur to man and child." His New York success was also covered in a May 1964 Time magazine article published, which described his career up until then "as an announcer on half a dozen radio stations before going into the now-widespread talk-to-the-listeners game on CKEY in Toronto four years ago."

In New York City, Crandall did voice-over commercials for many national clients, including narrating classified films for the army. He also narrated documentary films produced by the US Information Agency, including Next Stop: Africa (1970) and Kokosing (1970), and the US Department of State. In 1967, he changed his name legally to Bradley Crandall.

After moving his family to Los Angeles in the 1970s, Crandall did on-camera narrations for popular documentaries produced by Sunn Classic Pictures, including In Search of Noah's Ark (1976), Barry of the Great St. Bernard, The Lincoln Conspiracy (1977), Beyond and Back (1978), In Search of Historic Jesus (1979), Encounter with Disaster (1979) and The Bermuda Triangle (1979). He also did narrating work for NFL Films in the 1980s, including the highlight film for Super Bowl XIX.

At the time of his death from kidney failure at 63, Crandall lived on his boat in Redondo Beach, California.

== Influence ==
As a young man, Howard Stern was influenced by Crandall.
