= The Outer Space Connection =

- Directed by: Fred Warshofsky
- Produced by: Alan Landsburg
- Narrated by: Rod Serling
- Cinematography: Paul Desatoff
- Edited by: Thea Bentler
- Music by: Roger Wagner
- Production company: Alan Landsburg Productions
- Distributed by: Sunn Classic Pictures (1975-US); Brent Walker Film Distributing (1976-UK); National Broadcasting Company (1977-USt); Dolores Sostre Sobre (1978-Spain)
- Release date: 1975
- Country: United States
- Language: English

The Outer Space Connection is a 1975 documentary film produced by Alan Landsburg, directed by Fred Warshofsky and narrated by Rod Serling. This documentary was the last in a trilogy of ancient astronaut documentaries produced by Landsburg. This film was one of the last projects that Rod Serling worked on prior to his death in 1975.

== Plot ==
This documentary explores the controversial ancient astronauts theory that extraterrestrials explored the Earth in the distant past. These extraterrestrials had a profound effect on the creation of human life and the founding of civilization after which they left mankind to evolve on its own with a promise they would return at a future date for an unknown purpose.

== Production ==
Landsburg created two other television documentaries dealing with the ancient astronaut subject. In Search of Ancient Astronauts and In Search of Ancient Mysteries both produced in 1973. All three projects were narrated by Rod Serling. The Outer Space Connection was based on a book by the same name, also written by Landsburg and published by Bantam Books. The documentary was both directed and written by Fred Warshofsky, who also wrote and directed the previous film In Search of Ancient Mysteries. Parts of the film were shot in Park City, Utah. The film was released by Sunn Classic Pictures who also released the documentary film, Chariots of the Gods, in 1970. This film was released on VHS during the 1980s and is also found on many video sharing sites on the internet.

== See also ==
- In Search of... (TV series)
- Out-of-place artifact
- Xenoarchaeology
