= 21 grams experiment =

1907 scientific study by Duncan MacDougall

The 21 grams experiment refers to a study published in 1907 by Duncan MacDougall, a physician from Haverhill, Massachusetts. MacDougall hypothesized that souls have physical weight, and attempted to measure the mass lost by a human when the soul departed the body. MacDougall attempted to measure the mass change of six patients at the moment of death. One of the six subjects lost three-quarters of an ounce (21.3 grams).

MacDougall stated his experiment would have to be repeated many times before any conclusion could be obtained. The experiment is widely regarded as flawed and unscientific due to the small sample size, the methods used, as well as the fact only one of the six subjects met the hypothesis. The case has been cited as an example of selective reporting. Despite its rejection within the scientific community, MacDougall's experiment popularized the concept that the soul has weight, and specifically that it weighs 21 grams.

== Experiment ==
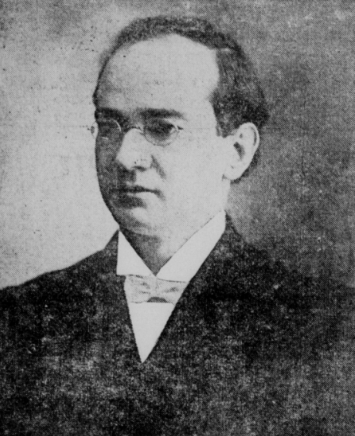
Duncan MacDougall, pictured in 1911.

In 1901, Duncan MacDougall, a physician from Haverhill, Massachusetts, who wished to scientifically determine if a soul had weight, identified six patients in nursing homes whose deaths were imminent. Four were suffering from tuberculosis, one from diabetes, and one from unspecified causes. MacDougall specifically chose people who were suffering from conditions that caused physical exhaustion, as he needed the patients to remain still when they died to measure them accurately. When the patients looked like they were close to death, their entire bed was placed on an industrial sized scale that was sensitive within two tenths of an ounce (5.6 grams). On the belief that humans have souls and that animals do not, MacDougall later measured the changes in weight from fifteen dogs after death. MacDougall said he wished to use dogs that were sick or dying for his experiment, though was unable to find any. It is therefore presumed he poisoned healthy dogs.

=== Results ===
One of the patients lost weight but then put the weight back on, and two of the other patients registered a loss of weight at death but a few minutes later lost even more weight. One of the patients lost "three-fourths of an ounce" (21.3 grams) in weight, coinciding with the time of death. MacDougall disregarded the results of another patient on the grounds the scales were "not finely adjusted", and discounted the results of another as the patient died while the equipment was still being calibrated. MacDougall said that none of the dogs lost any weight after death.

While MacDougall believed that the results from his experiment showed the human soul might have weight, his report, which was not published until 1907, stated the experiment would have to be repeated many times before any conclusion could be obtained.

== Reaction ==
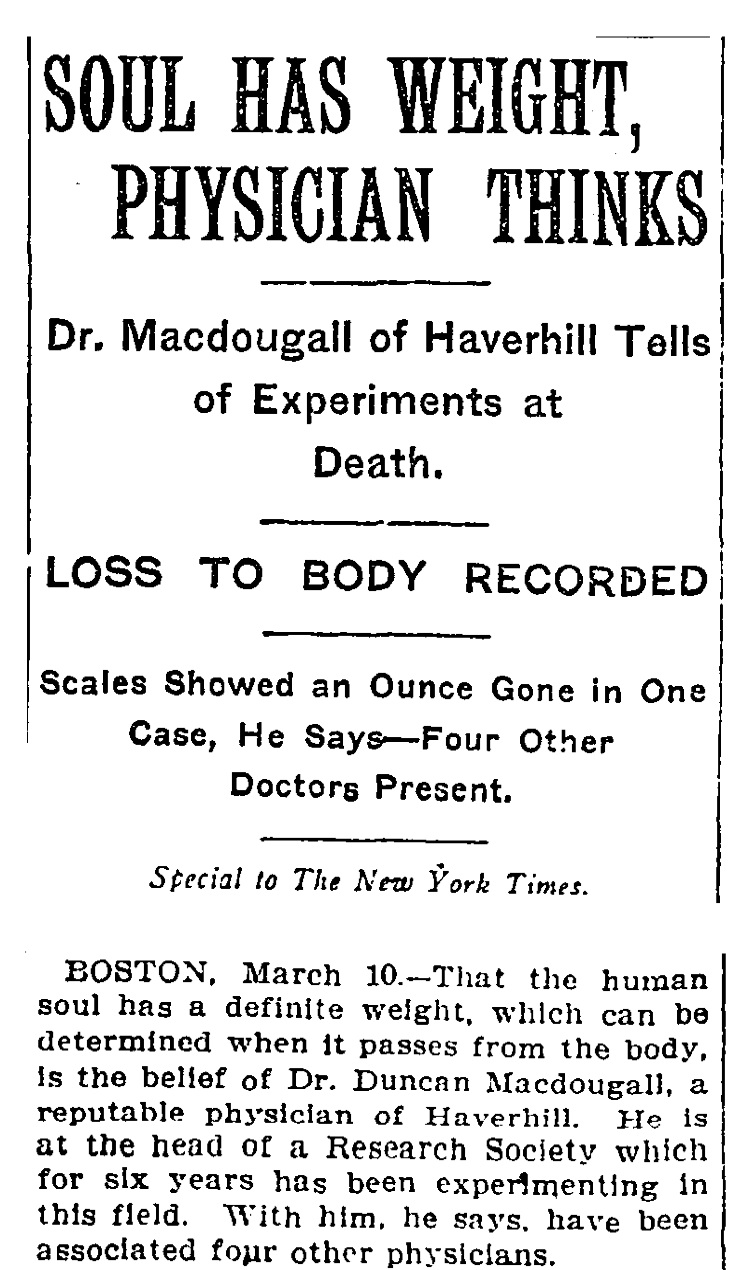
The New York Times article from 11 March 1907

Before MacDougall was able to publish the results of his experiments, The New York Times broke the story in an article titled "Soul has Weight, Physician Thinks." MacDougall's results were published in April of the same year in the Journal of the American Society for Psychical Research, and the medical journal American Medicine.

=== Criticism ===
Following the publication of the experiment in American Medicine, physician Augustus P. Clarke criticized the experiment's validity. Clarke noted that at the time of death there is a sudden rise in body temperature as the lungs are no longer cooling blood, causing a subsequent rise in sweating which could easily account for MacDougall's missing 21 grams. Clarke also pointed out that, as dogs do not have sweat glands, they would not lose weight in this manner after death. Clarke's criticism was published in the May issue of American Medicine. Arguments between MacDougall and Clarke debating the validity of the experiment continued to be published in the journal until at least December that year.

MacDougall's experiment has been rejected by the scientific community, and he has been accused of both flawed methods and outright fraud in obtaining his results. Noting that only one of the six patients measured supported the hypothesis, Karl Kruszelnicki has stated the experiment is a case of selective reporting, as MacDougall ignored the majority of the results. Kruszelnicki also criticized the small sample size, and questioned how MacDougall was able to determine the exact moment when a person had died considering the technology available at the time. Physicist Robert L. Park has written that MacDougall's experiments "are not regarded today as having any scientific merit", and psychologist Bruce Hood wrote that "because the weight loss was not reliable or replicable, his findings were unscientific." Professor Richard Wiseman said that within the scientific community, the experiment is confined to a "large pile of scientific curiosities labelled 'almost certainly not true'."

An article by Snopes in 2013 said the experiment was flawed because the methods used were suspect, the sample size was much too small, and the capability to measure weight changes too imprecise, concluding: "credence should not be given to the idea his experiments proved something, let alone that they measured the weight of the soul as 21 grams." The fact that MacDougall likely poisoned and killed fifteen healthy dogs in an attempt to support his research has also been a source of criticism.

=== Aftermath ===
In 1911, The New York Times reported that MacDougall was hoping to run experiments to take photos of souls, but he appears to not have continued any further research into the area and died in 1920. His experiment has not been repeated.

== Similar experiments ==
In December 2001, physicist Lewis E. Hollander Jr. published an article in Journal of Scientific Exploration where he exhibited the results of a similar experiment. He tested the weight of one ram, seven ewes, three lambs and one goat at the moment of death, seeking to explore upon MacDougall's purported findings. His experiment showed that seven of the adult sheep varied their weight upon dying, though not losing it, but rather gaining an amount of 18 to 780 grams, which was lost again over time until returning to their initial weight. In 2009, Hollander Jr.'s experiment was subjected to critical review by Masayoshi Ishida in the same journal. Ishida found Hollander's statement of a transient gain of weight was "not an appropriate expression of the experimental result", though he admitted "the cause of the force event remains to be explained." He also warned about possible malfunctions of the weighing platform in two of the cases.

Similarly inspired by MacDougall's research, physician Gerard Nahum proposed in 2005 a follow-up experiment, based on utilizing an array of electromagnetic detectors to try to pick up any type of escaping energy at the moment of death. He offered to sell his idea to engineering, physics, and philosophy departments at Yale, Stanford, and Duke University, as well as the Catholic Church, but he was rejected.

== In popular culture ==
Despite its rejection as scientific fact, MacDougall's experiment popularized the idea that the soul has weight, and specifically that it weighs 21 grams. The title of the film 21 Grams references the experiment.

The concept of a soul weighing 21 grams is mentioned in numerous media, including a 2013 issue of the manga Gantz, a 2013 podcast of Welcome to Night Vale, the 2015 film The Empire of Corpses, a 2021 episode of Ted Lasso, and a 2023 issue of the manga One Piece. Songs entitled "21 Grams" which reference the weight of a soul have been released by Looptroop Rockers (2005), Niykee Heaton (2015), Fedez (2015), August Burns Red (2015), Thundamentals (2017), Arena (2022), and Klan featuring Madeline Juno (2024). Songs that reference the concept include "Duck or Ape" by Roar (2010), "No Bystanders" by Travis Scott (2018), "La Yugular" by Rosalía (2025) and "The Manifesto" by Gorillaz (2026).

MacDougall and his experiments are explicitly mentioned in the 1978 documentary film Beyond and Back, and episode five of the first season of the 2011 television series Dark Matters: Twisted But True. A fictional American scientist named "Mr. MacDougall" appears in Gail Carriger's 2009 novel Soulless, as an expert in the weight and measurement of souls, and a similar experiment appears in the 2009 novel The Lost Symbol, conducted by the character Katherine Solomon in her noetic sciences lab. In 2022, the TV series Evil featured a fictional recreation of the experiment in the episode "The Demon of Death". In the 2016 alternate reality game Cipher Hunt, an encrypted message on a contract selling your soul can be deciphered as "you're now 21 grams lighter."

== See also ==
- Fringe science
