= Thom Pace =

American songwriter

- Birth name: Thomas Michael Pace
- Born: January 13, 1949 (age 76); Boise, Idaho
- Genres: Film score, theme song
- Occupation(s): Composer, musician, singer-songwriter
- Labels: RSO

Thomas Michael Pace (born January 13, 1949, in Boise, Idaho) is an American singer-songwriter, who is best known for the song "Maybe", which became the theme of The Life and Times of Grizzly Adams.

The song started out as a medley titled "Wear the Sun in Your Heart/Maybe." Pace had originally intended the song "Maybe" for the film The Snow Tigers, but ultimately it became the theme song of the Sunn Classic Pictures film and TV series, The Life and Times of Grizzly Adams, both of which were loosely based on a biography written by Charles E. Sellier. The program starred Dan Haggerty as James Capen Adams, whom the film and series both said had fled from false murder charges into the mountains and forest nearby. The made-for-television film The Capture of Grizzly Adams, which also starred Haggerty and also featured "Maybe" as its theme, finally showed Adams successfully clearing his name.

Another version, the theme from an album that Pace recorded and released during the 1970s, was released as a single in Europe. "Maybe" went to number one in Germany and stayed there for nine weeks. Pace received the "Goldene Europa" Award, Germany's version of the Grammy Award for Best Song of 1980. The song also reached No. 14 in the UK Singles Chart and No. 23 in the Australian Kent Music Report Singles Chart.

He also wrote and composed, often in collaboration with Maria Hegsted, songs for other films including the NBC "Movies of the Week" Vestige of Honor and Can You Feel Me Dancing, in addition to such feature films as Night of the Comet and State Park.

Pace remains involved with music, and he now lives in North Idaho.

== Discography ==
=== Albums ===
- 1980: Maybe – (Capitol Records)
- 2002: Not in Compliance
- 2018: Come Down Hard (Youth Rising) Thom Pace Music
