= Sunn Classic Pictures =

Defunct American film studio

- Type: Production company Film distributor
- Industry: Motion picture / television entertainment
- Founded: 1971
- Founder: Rayland Jensen
- Defunct: 1988 to 1990
- Fate: Closed by parent company
- Headquarters: Park City, Utah, United States
- Owner: Schick (1971–1980); Taft Broadcasting (1980–1987); Independent (2000–present)
- Website: www.sunnclassicpictures.com

Sunn Classic Pictures, also known as Sunn International Pictures, Schick Sunn Classic Pictures, and Taft International Pictures was an independent U.S.-based film distributor, founded in 1971. The company was notable for family films and documentaries, and was purchased by Taft Broadcasting in 1980.

== History ==
Sunn Classic was located in Park City, Utah, with offices in nearby Salt Lake City; its company name added an extra "n" to the word "Sun" to differentiate them from a publisher of pornographic books. The founder, Rayland Jensen, previously handled distribution of American National Enterprises' 1968 release, Alaskan Safari, which spent five years at the North American box office. In 1971, Jensen began his new company at the request of employees from the Schick razor company, at the time a subsidiary of Warner-Lambert. The founding executives were Jenson, Patrick Frawley (of Schick), and Charles E. Sellier Jr.

During its tenure, Sunn Classic spent US$85,000 in pre-production research on each of its films, conducting phone surveys and interviews with potential viewers. According to Bruce A. Austin, "Sunn identified as its market working-class families who rarely went to the movies more than twice a year". In the midst of the research, it released films with an MPAA rating of G, and in heavily marketed limited engagements. Through a process called four-wall distribution (or "four-walling"), the company would rent theaters to show its films, and retained all of the box office receipts.

Sunn Classic specialized in family entertainment such as 1974's The Life and Times of Grizzly Adams, and its subsequent spin-off television series on the NBC network. The Outer Space Connection was released in 1975. This documentary was produced by Alan Landsburg but was distributed by Sunn Classic. By 1977, domestic sales for Grizzly Adams reached upwards of US$24 million; another Sunn release, In Search of Noah's Ark, made US$26 million.

For 1977's The Lincoln Conspiracy, the company departed from its normal four wall distribution strategy to demand up-front guarantees from theatres. Among its other titles were 1979's In Search of Historic Jesus and 1983's Cujo.

The company also ran a television unit in tandem with its film department. Most of the company's 1970's productions were produced by Charles E. Sellier Jr and several were directed by a young James L. Conway and both would go on to long careers in the entertainment industry.

In July 1980, the company and two Schick divisions were purchased by Cincinnati-based Taft Enterprises for over US$2.5 million. Eventually, the new owner christened Sunn Classic as Taft International Pictures. The group became part of the Taft Entertainment Company. However, after Carl Lindner Jr. purchased Taft in 1987 and restructured it into Great American Broadcasting, the studio ceased operations. By the 2000s, the media and property assets of the original Sunn Classics were under new management.

Jensen and another fellow employee, Clair Farley, formed Jensen Farley Pictures to take over the theatrical distribution assets; one of their early releases was 1981's Private Lessons.

Currently, the Taft International Pictures' library is owned by Skydance Corporation subsidiary Paramount Pictures through Republic Pictures. However, very few films from that library have seen a DVD or Blu-ray release; those that have are mostly the later larger-budgeted Taft productions such as Cujo, Hangar 18, and The Boogens, although some of their TV shows like The Life and Times of Grizzly Adams have been released on DVD, under the CBS DVD banner due to CBS' ownership of the television side of the library. The home video rights to the Taft International Pictures' catalog are currently licensed to Kino Lorber, having prior been licensed to Olive Films and Lionsgate Home Entertainment.

== Production slate ==
A partial list of films produced:

=== Documentaries ===
- The Mysterious Monsters (1975). Peter Graves examines a range of supernatural topics, including mysterious monsters Bigfoot, the Loch Ness monster and the Yeti, and also psychics and hypnotism.
- The Outer Space Connection (1975). This documentary examines the speculation that aliens have visited Earth in ancient times, and built structures to which they will return at a future date.
- Guardian of the Wilderness (1976). Mountaineer Galen Clark (played by Denver Pyle) and naturalist John Muir (portrayed by John Dehner) work together in the 1860s to keep the logging companies from destroying Yosemite.
- In Search of Noah's Ark (1976). An investigation into the theory that Mt. Ararat in Turkey is the final resting place of Noah's Ark.
- The Amazing World of Psychic Phenomena (1976). Documentary exploring such phenomena as astral projection, telekinesis, telepathy, voices from beyond the grave, ghosts/spirits, etc.
- The Lincoln Conspiracy (1977). This film proposes a theory that the killer of President Abraham Lincoln escaped to Canada instead of being tracked down and killed soon after the assassination.
- Beyond and Back (1978). A documentary that explores the subject of near-death experiences.
- The Bermuda Triangle (1979). A documentary that explores the legends, facts and folklore about the dreaded "Bermuda Triangle".
- Beyond Death's Door (1979). A prostitute and a skier who have been "brought back" from the brink of death relate their experiences to a skeptical doctor, who begins to believe them.
- Encounter with Disaster (1979). An overview of historical disasters, narrated by Brad Crandall. Features such events as the Long Beach earthquake (1933), the Anchorage earthquake (1964), Hurricane Camille (1969), the super tornado outbreak (1974), the eruption of Mount Etna (1971), the Hindenburg crash (1937), the Le Mans crash (1955), the Andrea Doria sinking (1956), the Texas City explosion (1947), and the Joelma Building fire (1974).
- In Search of Historic Jesus (1979). This examination of historical sources speculates on the accuracy of the biblical depiction of Jesus.
- The President Must Die (1981). Documentary purporting to expose the cover-up of the JFK assassination conspiracy.

=== Films ===
- The Life and Times of Grizzly Adams (1974)
- The Adventures of Frontier Fremont (1976)
- Incredible Rocky Mountain Race (1977)
- Beyond and Back (1978)
- The Fall of the House of Usher (1979)
- Hangar 18 (1980)
- Earthbound (1981)
- The Boogens (1981)
- Cujo (1983)
- Light of Day (1987)
- The Monster Squad (1987)
- The Running Man (1987)
- Ironweed (1987)

=== Television films ===
From 1977 to 1982, the company produced a series of television films with the Classics Illustrated brand (Schick Sunn Classic Pictures executive Patrick Frawley owned the rights to Classics Illustrated during this period):

- Last of the Mohicans (1977)
- Donner Pass: The Road to Survival (1978)
- The Time Machine (1978)
- The Deerslayer (1978)
- The Fall of the House of Usher (1979)
- The Legend of Sleepy Hollow (1980)
- California Gold Rush (1981)
- The Adventures of Nellie Bly (1981)
- The Adventures of Huckleberry Finn (1981)
