= The Life and Times of Grizzly Adams =

1974 TV film and series

- Theatrical release poster
- Directed by: Richard Friedenberg
- Written by: Lawrence Dobkin
- Produced by: Charles E. Sellier Jr.; Raylan D. Jensen
- Starring: Dan Haggerty
- Cinematography: George Stapleford
- Edited by: George Stapleford
- Music by: Thom Pace
- Production company: Sunn Classic Pictures
- Distributed by: Sunn Classic Pictures; Sun International
- Release date: November 13, 1974
- Running time: 93 minutes
- Country: United States
- Budget: $125,000
- Box office: $65 million or $24 million

The Life and Times of Grizzly Adams
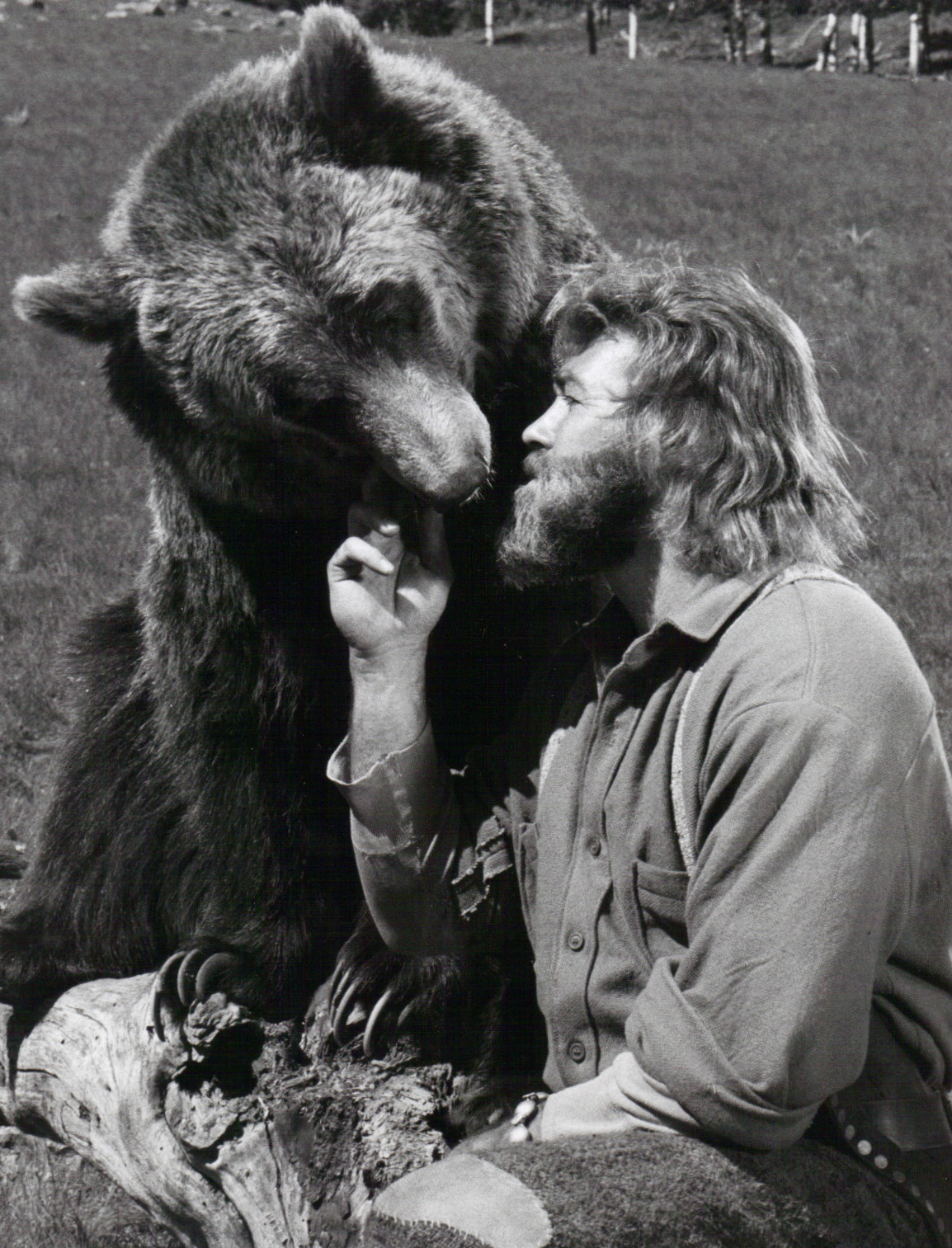
- Dan Haggerty as "Grizzly Adams" and Bozo the bear as "Ben", 1977
- Created by: Charles E. Sellier Jr.
- Starring: Dan Haggerty; Denver Pyle; Don Shanks
- Theme music composer: Thom Pace
- Opening theme: "Maybe"
- Country of origin: United States
- Original language: English
- No. of seasons: 2
- No. of episodes: 38

Production
- Running time: 60 minutes
- Production company: Schick Sunn Classic Productions

Original release
- Network: NBC
- Release: February 9, 1977 – May 12, 1978

The Life and Times of Grizzly Adams is a 1974 independent feature film produced by Charles E. Sellier Jr. and Raylan D. Jensen for Sunn Classic Pictures. The film's popularity led to an NBC television series of the same name. The title character, played by Dan Haggerty, was loosely based on California mountain man John "Grizzly" Adams (1812–1860).

== Plot ==
The film portrays the somewhat fictional Grizzly Adams as a frontier woodsman, who fled into the mountains in 1853, after he was accused of a murder he did not commit. While struggling to survive, Adams saves an orphaned grizzly bear cub he adopts and names Ben. The bear, while growing to its huge adult size, becomes Adams' closest companion. Consistently kind and gentle, Adams discovers and demonstrates an uncanny ability to gain the trust of most of the indigenous wildlife of the region, and he helps, sometimes rescues, takes in, and tames many species. Originally a hunter, with his learned affection for wildlife, Adams resolves never to harm another animal whenever possible.

Adams also gains two human friends, an old mountain-man trader named "Mad Jack", who is often featured with his mule ("Number Seven"), and a Native American by the name of "Nakoma". Adams, Mad Jack, and Nakoma help myriad mountain visitors while protecting wildlife at the same time.

NBC aired the series finale of the TV series on February 21, 1982, by way of a two-hour TV movie called The Capture of Grizzly Adams; it presents an ending diverging from the 1974 TV movie portrayal. A hateful rancher, whose partner Adams allegedly killed, uses Adams' daughter Peg, who was not seen or mentioned since the 1974 film, in a ploy to lure the fugitive mountain man back to civilization and kill him. In the end, Adams exposes the rancher for the murder for which he was himself accused, proving his innocence.

== Cast ==
=== TV series ===
- Dan Haggerty as James Capen "Grizzly" Adams
- Denver Pyle as Mad Jack
- Don Shanks as Nakoma
- John Bishop as Robbie Cartman
- Bozo (a grizzly bear) as Ben (named after Benjamin Franklin)

In addition to Ben, many other named animals were in the TV series, the most prominent being "Number 7", Mad Jack's ornery mule. Bart the Bear, then a bear cub, made one of his first acting appearances in the series playing Ben as a cub.

=== 1974 film ===
- Lisa Jones as Young Peg
- Marjorie Harper as Adult Peg
- William Woodson as Narrator

=== The Capture of Grizzly Adams ===
- Sydney Penny as Peg Adams
- Kim Darby as Kate Bradey
- Chuck Connors as Frank Briggs
- G. W. Bailey as Tom Quigley
- Noah Beery Jr. as Sheriff Hawkins
- June Lockhart as Mrs. Hawkins
- Spencer Alston as Daniel Quigley
- Peg Stewart as Widow Thompkins
- Ken Kemp as Ezra Thompkins

== Production ==
The Life and Times of Grizzly Adams TV series was created by Charles E. Sellier Jr. and produced through Schick Sunn Classic Pictures, a company based in Park City, Utah, and operated by its founding executives, Patrick Frawley, Sellier, and Rayland Jenson. Parts of the series were shot in the Uinta National Forest, Wasatch National Forest, and Park City. The low-budget independent studio successfully introduced innovative marketing and promotional methods. Its 1974 Grizzly Adams movie was a runaway success. Produced on a $140,000 budget, the film grossed over $45 million at the domestic box office and $65 million worldwide. It was the seventh-highest-grossing film of 1974. The 43% market share captured by a 1976 airing of the film on NBC led to network executives green-lighting the television series. The series drew a 32% market share, a significant figure to this day. The series also aired at a time when the environmental movement was beginning to flourish.

Bozo was purchased from a Kansas zoo and trained by R.E. (Bob) Leonard.

The show's theme song, "Maybe", was written and sung by Thom Pace. The song was released as a single in Europe. It spent nine weeks at number one in the single charts in Germany from November 19, 1979, to January 20, 1980. In Switzerland it reached number 2 and in Austria it rose to number eight. In 1980, it won Germany's Goldene Europa award for best song. At the beginning of each episode, part of the theme song is sung, while at the end, the entire theme song is sung. "Mad Jack" also introduces the circumstances of Grizzly Adams, referring to him as a "greenhorn", his friendship with Ben, and all of the animals. After selling many products bearing the Grizzly Adams brand name, the brand was eventually trademarked by its creator, Sellier. Following Sellier's death in early 2011, the brand rights were transferred to Grizzly Adams LLC.

Production for the series also took place in Utah, with location work in Arizona and Ruidoso, New Mexico, depending on weather conditions, due to the similarities in terrain. As with the film, animals were provided and trained by the Olympic Game Farm, housed at a second game farm built at Woodland, Utah. A scaled-down version of Grizzly Adams' cabin, used to make Dan Haggerty appear taller, is currently located at the Olympic Game Farm in Sequim, Washington.

== Home media ==
Shout! Factory, under license from CBS Home Entertainment, released both seasons in two region-1, four-DVD sets: Season 1 on November 6, 2012, and Season 2 on February 19, 2013. The same eight discs were reissued as Grizzly Adams: The Complete Series on May 31, 2016.

The season sets do not include the 1974 film The Life and Times of Grizzly Adams, which led to the series. The Season 2 set does include Once Upon a Starry Night, which aired just after the regular series ended in 1978, but not The Capture of Grizzly Adams, which aired in 1982.

On November 12, 2013, CBS Home Entertainment released The Capture of Grizzly Adams on DVD in Region 1.

== Episodes ==
=== Season 1 (1977) ===
No. overall	No. in season	Title	Directed by	Written by	Original release date	Prod. code
1	1	"Adam's Cub"	James L. Conway	Arthur Heinemann	February 9, 1977	704
2	2	"Blood Brothers"	Jack B. Hively	Paul W. Cooper	February 16, 1977	703
3	3	"Fugitive"	Richard Friedenberg	Story by : Hindi Brooks; Teleplay by : Paul Hunter & Arthur Heinemann	February 23, 1977	705
4	4	"Unwelcome Neighbor"	James L. Conway	Story by : Larry Dobkin; Teleplay by : Paul Hunter	March 2, 1977	701
5	5	"Howdy-Do, I'm Mad Jack"	Jack B. Hively	Jim Carlson & Terrence McDonnell	March 9, 1977	706
6	6	"Adam's Ark"	Jack B. Hively	Samuel A. Peeples	March 16, 1977	709
7	7	"The Redemption of Ben"	James L. Conway	Story by : Samuel A. Peeples; Teleplay by : Jim Carlson & Terrence McDonnell	March 23, 1977	710
8	8	"The Tenderfoot"	James L. Conway	Samuel A. Peeples	March 30, 1977	707
9	9	"The Rivals"	Sharon Miller	Story by : Joyce Perry & Larry Dobkin; Teleplay by : Paul Hunter	April 6, 1977	712
10	10	"The Unholy Beast"	Jack B. Hively	Story by : Kenneth Dorward; Teleplay by : Kenneth Dorward and Jim Carlson & Terrence McDonnell	April 20, 1977	711
11	11	"Beaver Dam"	Richard Friedenberg	Paul Hunter	April 27, 1977	702
12	12	"Home of the Hawk"	Richard Friedenberg	Jon Gerald & Jane MacKenzie	May 5, 1977	708
13	13	"The Storm"	Richard Friedenberg	Preston Wood	May 12, 1977	713

=== Season 2 (1977–78) ===
No. overall	No. in season	Title	Directed by	Written by	Original release date	Prod. code
14	1	"Hot Air Hero"	Richard Friedenberg	E. Jack Kaplan	September 28, 1977	718
15	2	"Survival"	Sharon Miller	Peter Germano	October 12, 1977	715
16	3	"A Bear's Life"	Jack B. Hively	Paul W. Cooper	October 19, 1977	716
17	4	"The Trial"	Jack B. Hively	David O'Malley	October 26, 1977	714
18	5	"The Orphans"	Jack B. Hively	Story by : Ray Goldrup; Teleplay by : Ray Goldrup & Malvin Wald	November 2, 1977	723
19	6	"The Search"	Richard Friedenberg	Leonard B. Kaufman & Malvin Wald	November 9, 1977	720
20	7	"Gold is Where You Find It"	Richard Friedenberg	Story by : Dick Conway & Leonard B. Kaufman; Teleplay by : Dick Conway	November 23, 1977	724
21	8	"Track of the Cougar"	Sharon Miller	Worley Thorne	December 14, 1977	719
22	9	"The Choice"	Sharon Miller	Leonard B. Kaufman & Malvin Wald	December 21, 1977	717
23	10	"Woman in the Wilderness"	Richard Friedenberg	Leonard B. Kaufman & Malvin Wald	December 28, 1977	722
24	11	"The Spoilers"	Jack B. Hively	Story by : Leonard Kaufman & Malvin Wald; Teleplay by : Malvin Wald	January 4, 1978	727
25	12	"Marvin the Magnificent"	Jack B. Hively	Jack Jacobs	January 11, 1978	721
26	13	"A Time of Thirsting"	Jack B. Hively	Brian Russell	January 18, 1978	725
27	14	"The Seekers"	Richard Friedenberg	Story by : Christopher Jean-Pierre De Tocqueville & Brian Russell; Teleplay by : Brian Russell	January 25, 1978	726
28	15	"A Gentleman Tinker"	David O'Malley	Brian Russell	February 8, 1978	730
29	16	"The Runaway"	Jack B. Hively	Malvin Wald & Jack Jacobs	February 22, 1978	729
30	17	"The Great Burro Race"	Jack B. Hively	Dick Conway	March 1, 1978	733
31	18	"The Littlest Greenhorn"	Richard Friedenberg	Malvin Wald & Jack Jacobs	March 15, 1978	732
32	19	"The Renewal"	Jack B. Hively	Malvin Wald & Jack Jacobs	March 22, 1978	736
33	20	"The Stranger"	Jack B. Hively	Leonard B. Kaufman	April 5, 1978	728
34	21	"The Quest"	Chris Munger	Story by : Kirby Timmons and Malvin Wald & Jack Jacobs; Teleplay by : Malvin Wald & Jack Jacobs	April 26, 1978	734
35	22	"The Skyrider"	Allan Eastman	Story by : Dick Conway & Fenton Hobart Jr. Teleplay by : Dick Conway	May 5, 1978	735
36	23	"The World's Greatest Bounty Hunter"	S. Travis	Jim Carlson & Dick Conway & Terrence McDonnell	May 12, 1978	731
37	24	"Once Upon a Starry Night"	Jack B. Hively	Brian Russell & James Simmons	December 19, 1978	737
Theatrically released as Legend of the Wild.

== Sequels ==
Dan Haggerty also played Jeremiah, a modern-day version of Grizzly Adams, in the films Grizzly Mountain (1997) and Escape to Grizzly Mountain (2000).

== See also ==
- Gentle Giant (1967)
- The Adventures of Frontier Fremont (1976)
- List of American films of 1974
