= In Search of Historic Jesus =

- Theatrical release poster
- Directed by: Henning Schellerup
- Screenplay by: Jack Jacobs; Lee Roddy; Charles E. Sellier Jr. Robert Starling; Malvin Wald
- Based on: In Search of Historic Jesus by Lee Roddy and Charles E. Sellier Jr.
- Produced by: James L. Conway; Bill Cornford; Charles E. Sellier Jr.
- Starring: John Rubinstein; Brad Crandall
- Narrated by: Brad Crandall
- Cinematography: Paul Hipp; George Stapleford
- Edited by: Kendall S. Rase
- Music by: Bob Summers
- Distributed by: Sunn Classic Pictures
- Release date: August 1979
- Running time: 91 minutes
- Country: United States
- Language: English
- Box office: $22.4 million or $10.6 million

In Search of Historic Jesus is a 1979 American documentary film based on Lee Roddy and Charles E. Sellier Jr.'s book of the same name. Released by Sunn Classic Pictures, the film speculates on the historical accuracy of the Biblical depiction of Jesus.

== Cast ==
- John Rubinstein as Jesus
- John Anderson as Caiaphas
- Nehemiah Persoff as Herod Antipas
- Brad Crandall as Narrator
- Andrew Bloch as Apostle John
- Morgan Brittany as Mary
- Walter Brooke as Joseph of Arimathea
- Annette Charles as Mary Magdalene
- Royal Dano as Prophet #1
- Anthony De Longis as Peter
- Lawrence Dobkin as Pontius Pilate
- Jeffrey Druce as Thomas
- John Hoyt as Synagogue Man #1
- Stanley Kamel as Andrew
- David Opatoshu as Herod
- Al Ruscio as Priest #1
- Harvey Solin as Priest #2
- Richard Alfieri as Blind Man
- Robert Bonvento as Roman Legionnaire
- Richard Carlyle as Astrologer
- Travis DeCastro as Siloam Pool Man
- Steve DeFrance as 2nd Thief
- John Hansen as Baptised Man
- James Ingersoll as Centurion #1
- Richard Jury as Court Member
- Jenna Michaels as Siloam Pool Woman
- David Nelson as Leper
- Marsha Reider as Martha
- John Mark Robinson as Roman Soldier
- Michael Ruud as John the Baptist
- Dennis Saylor as Judas
- Peg Stewart as Mother of Blind Man
- Jean Stringam as Hebrew Mother
- George Sullivan as Thief #1
- Tiger Thompson as Young Jesus
- Scott Wilkinson as Cassius
- H.M. Wynant Astronomer
- Peter Mark Richman as God (voice)

== Production notes ==
In Search of Historic Jesus was produced by Sunn Classic Pictures, a Utah-based independent film company that specialized in releasing low-budget family films and documentaries. Along with such features as In Search of Noah's Ark (1976) and Beyond and Back (1978), the film was one of a series of releases from the company that attempted to present convincing scientific evidence for Christian theology.

Parts of the film were shot in Heber, Provo, and Park City in Utah.

== Reception ==
Although In Search of Historic Jesus was a major commercial success, the picture met with some negative critical reviews. According to movie historian Leonard Maltin, who declared the film a "BOMB" (his lowest possible rating), "This drivel should have been titled In Search of Morons Who Will Believe Anything."

Produced on a low budget, the movie earned over $22.4 million at the North American box office and was the 33rd highest-grossing film of 1979.

== See also ==
- Historical Jesus
- Historicity of Jesus
  - Sources for the historicity of Jesus
- Historicity of the Bible
