= In Search of Noah's Ark =

- Theatrical release poster
- Directed by: James L. Conway
- Screenplay by: James L. Conway; Charles E. Sellier Jr.
- Based on: In Search of Noah's Ark by David W. Balsiger; Charles E. Sellier Jr.
- Produced by: Charles E. Sellier Jr.
- Starring: Brad Crandall; Vern Adix
- Cinematography: Stephen W. Gray; George Stapleford
- Edited by: Sharron Miller
- Music by: Bob Summers
- Distributed by: Sunn Classic Pictures
- Release date: December 24, 1976
- Running time: 94 minutes
- Country: United States
- Language: English
- Box office: $55.7 million or $24 million

In Search of Noah's Ark is a 1976 American documentary film based on David W. Balsiger and Charles E. Sellier Jr.'s book of the same name. Released by Sunn Classic Pictures, it explores the alleged final resting place of Noah's Ark.

== Production notes ==
In Search of Noah's Ark was produced by Sunn Classic Pictures, a Utah-based independent film company that specialized in releasing low-budget family films and documentaries. Along with such features as Beyond and Back (1978) and In Search of Historic Jesus (1979), the film was one of a series of releases from the company that attempted to present convincing scientific evidence for Christian theology. Parts of the film were shot in Park City, Utah.

The film was based on the book by David W. Balsiger. The documentary makes the assertion that Noah's Ark, from the biblical flood narrative, has been found on the slopes of Mount Ararat in Turkey, though physical and political difficulties prevent a more extensive study of the alleged vessel. The movie includes a re-enactment of Noah's story as one of its highlights.

== Reception ==
Produced on a low budget, In Search of Noah's Ark was a commercial success, grossing $55.7 million at the North American box office, making it the ninth highest grossing film of 1976 in the United States.

== Follow-up film ==
On February 20, 1993, CBS aired a television special entitled The Incredible Discovery of Noah's Ark. Produced by Sunn Classic Pictures, it was intended as an updated follow-up to In Search of Noah's Ark. Hosted by Darren McGavin, the special features interviews with John C. Whitcomb, Philip C. Hammond, Charles Berlitz, David Coppedge, Carl Baugh and Tim LaHaye. The special included a section devoted to the claims of George Jammal, who showed what he called "sacred wood from the ark." Jammal's story of a dramatic mountain expedition which took the life of "his Polish friend Vladimir" was actually a deliberate hoax concocted with scholar Gerald Larue. Jammal – who was really an actor – later revealed that his "sacred wood" was taken from railroad tracks in Long Beach, California and hardened by cooking with various sauces in an oven.

== See also ==
- Searches for Noah's Ark
- Genesis flood narrative
- List of topics characterized as pseudoscience
- List of highest-grossing documentary films
