= Charles Sellier =

American producer and director

- Born: Charles Edward Sellier Jr. November 9, 1943; Pascagoula, Mississippi, U.S.
- Died: January 31, 2011 (aged 67); Coeur d'Alene, Idaho, U.S.
- Other name: Robert Wesley
- Occupations: Television producer, and director

Charles Edward Sellier Jr. (November 9, 1943 – January 31, 2011) was an American television producer, screenwriter, novelist and director, best known for creating the American book and television series The Life and Times of Grizzly Adams. He was also known for directing the notorious Christmas themed slasher film Silent Night, Deadly Night. Over the course of his four decade career, Sellier wrote and produced more than thirty films and 230 television shows.

== Life and career ==
Sellier was born in Pascagoula, Mississippi, on November 9, 1943. He was the only son of Charles Edward Senior and Gladys Carson Sellier. His father worked as a shipping clerk. Sellier was born as a Cajun Catholic, later converting to Mormonism and then to evangelical Christianity.

The Life and Times of Grizzly Adams, which aired on NBC during the 1977–1978 television season, depicted a character, portrayed by actor Dan Haggerty, who escapes a bounty hunter and rescues a bear cub who becomes his constant companion in the series. Sellier had first introduced the character in his 1972 novel, The Life and Times of Grizzly Adams, loosely based on the real-life 19th century mountain man, James "Grizzly" Adams. The series was produced by Sunn Classic Pictures, a production company based in Park City, Utah, founded by Mel Hardman, which Sellier joined in 1974. The Life and Times of Grizzly Adams ran for two seasons, but was concluded in the 1982 television movie, The Capture of Grizzly Adams, in which Dan Haggerty reprised his role.

Additionally, Sellier wrote and produced more than 230 television shows and thirty feature films during his career. Eleven of Sellier's feature films are included in the top 100 highest-grossing independent films in history, with six of those films ranking in the top twenty-five.

Sellier produced numerous films and television shows, often with American pioneer or Christian themes aimed at family-friendly audiences. His production credits included In Search of Noah's Ark, In Search of Historic Jesus, Mark Twain's America, The Lincoln Conspiracy, The Incredible Discovery of Noah's Ark and Breaking the Da Vinci Code. In 1980, Sellier was nominated for an Emmy Award for his work on the made-for-television movie, The Legend of Sleepy Hollow, which starred Jeff Goldblum as Ichabod Crane. Sellier was a member of the Academy of Television Arts & Sciences, the Writers Guild of America and National Religious Broadcasters Association.

Sellier was the CEO of Grizzly Adams Prods. at the time of death in 2011. The company marketed family-friendly and faith-based documentaries, films and television shows. At the time of his death, Sellier had been negotiating an agreement with Passmorelab of San Diego to convert films and television shows he produced to 3D for Blu-ray 3D DVDs and 3D television broadcasting, though said '3D conversions' never materialized.

Sellier died unexpectedly at his home in Coeur d'Alene, Idaho, on January 31, 2011, at the age of 67. During his first marriage to his working partner, Donna Sellier, the couple had two sons. Their elder son, Donald Sellier, predeceased Charles. He is survived by: their other son, William Sellier; by Julie Magnuson, Charles's second wife; and by Charles Edward Sellier III, his son with Julie.

== Filmography ==
=== As producer ===
- 1973 The Brothers O'Toole (producer)
- 1974 The Life and Times of Grizzly Adams (producer)
- 1976 Guardian of the Wilderness (producer)
- 1976 In Search of Noah's Ark (documentary) (producer)
- 1976 The Mysterious Monsters (documentary) (producer)
- 1976 The Amazing World of Psychic Phenomena (documentary) (producer)
- 1976 The Adventures of Frontier Fremont (producer)
- 1977 Incredible Rocky Mountain Race (TV movie) (executive producer)
- 1977 Last of the Mohicans (TV movie) (executive producer)
- 1977 The Lincoln Conspiracy (producer)
- 1977 The Life and Times of Grizzly Adams (TV series) (executive producer)
- 1978 The Deerslayer (TV movie) (executive producer)
- 1978 The Time Machine (TV movie) (executive producer)
- 1978 Donner Pass: The Road to Survival (TV movie) (executive producer)
- 1978 Beyond and Back (documentary) (producer)
- 1979 The Fall of the House of Usher (executive producer)
- 1979 Beyond Death's Door (producer)
- 1979 In Search of Historic Jesus (documentary) (producer)
- 1979 The Bermuda Triangle (documentary) (producer)
- 1979 Encounter with Disaster (documentary) (producer)
- 1979 Greatest Heroes of the Bible (TV series) (executive producer – 2 episodes)
  - Daniel and Nebuchadnezzar (1979) (executive producer)
  - The Story of Esther (1979) (executive producer)
- 1980 The Legend of Sleepy Hollow (TV movie) (executive producer)
- 1980 Hangar 18 (producer)
- 1981 Legend of the Wild (producer)
- 1981 The Nashville Grab (TV movie) (executive producer)
- 1981 The Boogens (producer)
- 1981 California Gold Rush (TV movie) (executive producer)
- 1981 The Adventures of Huckleberry Finn (TV movie) (executive producer)
- 1981 The Adventures of Nellie Bly (TV movie) (executive producer)
- 1981 Earthbound (executive producer)
- 1982 The Capture of Grizzly Adams (TV movie) (executive producer)
- 1984 Silent Night, Deadly Night (director – as Charles E. Sellier Jr.)
- 1987 Snowballing (producer)
- 1987 Desperado (TV movie) (producer – as Chuck Sellier)
- 1988 Desperado: Avalanche at Devil's Ridge (TV movie) (supervising producer)
- 1988 The Return of Desperado (TV movie) (supervising producer)
- 1989 Desperado: Badlands Justice (TV movie) (producer – as Chuck Sellier)
- 1989 Desperado: The Outlaw Wars (TV movie) (producer – as Chuck Sellier)
- 1989 Men (TV series) (producer – 1 episode)
  - Baltimore (1989) (producer)
- 1990 Vestige of Honor (TV movie) (supervising producer – as Chuck Sellier)
- 1991 Brotherhood of the Gun (TV movie) (producer – as Chuck Sellier)
- 1991 Knight Rider 2000 (TV movie) (producer – as Chuck Sellier)
- 1993 Ancient Secrets of the Bible, Part II (TV documentary) (executive producer – as Charles E. Sellier)
- 1993 The Incredible Discovery of Noah's Ark (TV documentary) (executive producer – as Charles E. Sellier)
- 1994 Mysteries of the Ancient World (TV documentary) (executive producer)
- 1995 UFO Diaries (TV mini-series) (producer)
- 2000–2002 Encounters with the Unexplained (TV series documentary) (supervising producer – 49 episodes)
  - Political Victim: Vince Foster – Suicide or Political Execution?/Attack on America: Were There Miracles Amidst the Mayhem of 911? (2002) (supervising producer)
  - America's Lost Colony: Has the Lost Colony of Roanoke Been Found?/Prophetic Last Days: Have We Entered the End Times? (2002) (supervising producer)
  - Global Climate Changes: Will Global Warming Change Our Lives?/Biblical Paradise: Have We Found the Garden of Eden? (2002) (supervising producer)
  - Deadly Insects: Are We Creating Killer Insects?/Fields of Mystery: Are Crop Circles the Language of Aliens? (2002) (supervising producer)
  - Has the Lost Colony of Roanoke Been Found?/Are the End Times Here? (2002) (supervising producer)
- 2004 The Evidence for Heaven (TV movie) (supervising producer)
- 2004 George W. Bush: Faith in the White House (video documentary) (supervising producer)
- 2005 The Miraculous Mission (TV documentary) (supervising producer)
- 2005 12 Ordinary Men (TV movie) (supervising producer)
- 2005 Breaking the Da Vinci Code (video documentary) (supervising producer)
- 2005 The Da Vinci Code Deception: Solving the 2000 Year Old Mystery (TV movie) (supervising producer)
- 2005 The Search for Heaven (video documentary) (supervising producer)
- 2006 Miracles in Our Midst (TV movie) (supervising producer)
- 2006 Heroes Among Us, Miracles Around Us (video documentary) (supervising producer – as Chuck Sellier)
- 2006 Apocalypse and the End Times (video documentary) (supervising producer – as Chuck Sellier)
- 2006 End Times How Close Are We? (TV movie) (supervising producer)
- 2006 Portrait of Courage: The Untold Story of Flight 93 (video documentary) (supervising producer)
- 2006 The Heroes of Flight 93 (TV movie) (supervising producer)
- 2007 The Longevity Secret (video documentary) (supervising producer)
- 2007 Miraculous Messages (TV movie) (supervising producer)
- 2007 The Case for Christ's Resurrection (TV movie) (supervising producer)
- 2007 Fabric of Time (video) (supervising producer)
- 2008 Friends for Life (supervising producer)
- 2008 Unlocking the Secret (video) (supervising producer)

=== As director ===
- 1979 Encounter with Disaster (documentary)
- 1984 Silent Night, Deadly Night
- 1985 The Annihilators
- 1987 Snowballing

=== As writer ===
- 1976 Guardian of the Wilderness
- 1976 In Search of Noah's Ark (documentary) (book "In Search of Noah's Ark" / screenplay)
- 1976 The Adventures of Frontier Fremont (story)
- 1977 The Lincoln Conspiracy (book)
- 1977 The Life and Times of Grizzly Adams (TV series)
  - The Trial (1977) (creator)
  - A Bear's Life (1977) (creator)
  - Survival (1977) (creator)
  - Hot Air Hero (1977) (creator)
  - Home of the Hawk (1977) (creator)
- 1979 In Search of Historic Jesus (documentary) (writer)
- 1979 Greatest Heroes of the Bible (TV series)
  - Abraham's Sacrifice (1979) (developer)
  - Daniel and Nebuchadnezzar (1979) (developer)
- 1980 Hangar 18 (book with Robert Weverka)
- 1982 The Capture of Grizzly Adams (TV movie) (book)
- 1992 Ancient Secrets of the Bible (TV documentary)
- 1992 Miracles and Other Wonders (TV docudramas; book 1994)
- 1993 Ancient Secrets of the Bible, Part II (TV documentary) (book / as Charles E. Sellier)
- 1993 The Incredible Discovery of Noah's Ark (TV documentary) (book / as Charles E. Sellier)
- 2008 Friends for Life
