= Berekeh =

Berekeh or Barakeh or Barkeh or Berkeh (Persian: بركه) may refer to:

== Places ==
=== Iran ===
==== Fars Province ====
- Berkeh, Fars
- Berkeh-ye Mah Banu
- Berkeh-ye Mollai
- Berkeh-ye Sefid

==== Hormozgan Province ====
- Barkeh Lari
- Berkeh-ye Khalaf
- Berkeh-ye Now
- Berkeh-ye Soflin
- Berkeh-ye Soltan

==== Other provinces ====
- Barakeh, Divandarreh, Kurdistan
- Barkeh-ye Chupan, Bushehr Province
- Berekeh, Lorestan, Lorestan Province

=== Syria ===
- Barakeh, Hama, also spelt Barakah and Birkah, a Syrian village

== People ==
- Mohammad Barakeh, Israeli politician

== See also ==
- Al Baraka (disambiguation)
- Baraka (disambiguation)
- Berakhah, in Judaism, a blessing usually recited during a ceremony
