= Baraka (surname) =

Baraka is a surname. Notable people with the surname include:

- Abdelaziz Baraka Sakin (born 1963), Sudanese fiction writer
- Ajamu Baraka (born 1953), human rights activist and 2016 candidate for Vice President of the United States
- Ali Baraka, senior Hamas official based in Beirut
- Amina Baraka (born 1942), American poet, actress, author, community organizer, singer, dancer, and activist
- Amiri Baraka (1934–2014), American writer
- Hassan Baraka (born 1987), Moroccan open water swimmer
- Iqbal Baraka (born 1942), Egyptian journalist, women's rights activist, and writer
- Joshua Baraka (born 2000), Ugandan recording artist and music producer
- Léonard Baraka (born 1985), Malagasy former footballer
- Mouigni Baraka (born 1968), Comorian politician
- Nizar Baraka (born 1964), Moroccan politician and businessman
- Ras J. Baraka (born 1970), American politician and current mayor of Newark, New Jersey
- Rhonda Baraka (born 1962), American film and television director and screenwriter
- Sara Baraka (born 1991), Egyptian Olympic rower
- Sayyid Baraka (1343–1403), holy man of the commercial city of Tirmidh
- Sho Baraka (born 1979), American Christian hip-hop artist and writer
- Usumain Baraka, Sudanese activist and asylum seeker living in Israel
- Wissam Baraka (born 1985), Moroccan footballer

== See also ==
- Al-Said Barakah (1260–1280), Mamluk Sultan
- Athanasios Barakas, Greek Paralympian athlete
- Baraka
