= Barka =

Barka, Barca or Barqa or Barkah may refer to:

== Places ==
=== Eritrea ===
- Barka (Eritrea), a former province of Eritrea
- Barka River, a river in Eritrea and Sudan

=== Libya ===
- Barca (ancient city), in eastern Libya
- Cyrenaica, a region comprising most of eastern Libya, "Barqa" in Arabic

=== Other countries ===
- Barkah, Afghanistan, a village in north-eastern Afghanistan
- El Barka, a village in Tamanrasset Province, Algeria
- Darling River, Australia, known as Barka or Baaka in the local Paakantyi language
- Barkah, Iran, a village in Razavi Khorasan Province, Iran
- Barka, Oman, a town in Oman
- Barqa, Gaza, a Palestinian village depopulated in 1948
- Barka, Pomeranian Voivodeship, a settlement in northern Poland
- Barka, Saudi Arabia, a village in Saudi Arabia
- Barka, Divača, a village in Slovenia

== People ==
- Barca or Barcas, the cognomen of a Carthaginian dynasty, see Barcid
- Barka Vasyl (1908–2003), Ukrainian writer
- Koço Barka (1954–2024), Albanian politician
- Mehdi Ben Barka (1920–1965), Moroccan politician

== Other uses ==
- "Lord, You Have Come to the Lakeshore", 1974 Spanish religious song, in Polish "Barka"
- Barça, nickname of Spanish association football club FC Barcelona

== See also ==
- Baraka (disambiguation)
- Barakat (disambiguation)
- Barkha (disambiguation)
- Barkaa, Australian rapper and musician
