= Al-Bad' =

Al-Bad' Governorate محافظة البدع
- City and Governorate
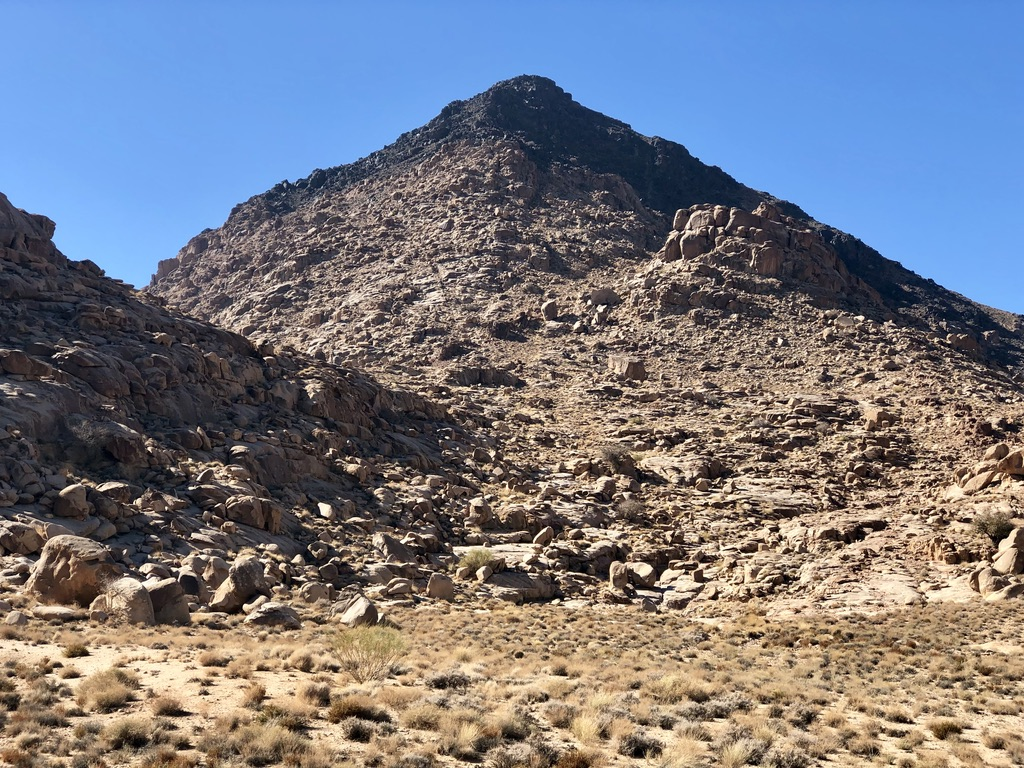
- Mount Jabal Maqla

- Map Showing the Governorate’s Location within Tabuk Province

- Location of Al-Bad' within Saudi Arabia
- Coordinates: 28°28′29″N 35°00′53″E
- Country: Saudi Arabia
- Province: Tabuk Province
- Region: Hejaz
- Seat: Al-Bad' City

Government
  - Type: Municipality
  - Body: Al-Bad' Municipality

Area
  - City and Governorate: 4,000 km^{2} (1,500 sq mi)
- Highest elevation (Jabal Maqla): 2,326 m (7,631 ft)

Population (2022)
  - Metro: 17,973 (Al-Bad' Governorate)
- Time zone: UTC+03:00 (SAST)
- Area code: 014

Al-Badʿ (Arabic: البدع [alˈbadʕ]) is a city and governorate in the Tabuk Province of Saudi Arabia. It is part of the Hejaz region and historically part of southern Midian. The governorate lies near the coast of the Gulf of Aqaba, and its coastal areas are known for their natural coral reef formations.

== History ==
Al-Bad' was one of the largest Nabataean cities, The Nabataeans very probably settled on a trade route that already existed in the Iron Age, lithic tools was found to be contemporary Neolithic productions a hiatus followed the period, until the Late Bronze Age/Iron Age, the permanence of settlement in the oasis lasted after the 1st century.

rock-cut facades on coarse-grained sandstone are found in the area known as Mughayr Shu‘ayb.

== Geography ==
To the east of the governorate lie the Sarawat Mountains, forming the northern end of the Hejaz Mountains. The area is noted for Neolithic petroglyphs carved into the arid volcanic rock. Northeast of the governorate is Jabal al-Lawz (Arabic: جبل اللوز), which, at 2,500 meters, is among the highest peaks in Saudi Arabia. South of Jabal al-Lawz is the 2,300-meter Jabal Maqla, a volcanic peak capped with black basalt. The surrounding volcanic region consists largely of granite, with sparse grassland vegetation and occasional trees.

== Administrative divisions ==
- Makna
- Qiyal
- Al-Aseelah
- Abu Rummanah

== Religious significance ==
The governorate of Al-Bad' is located within the traditional Hejaz region of Saudi Arabia, and its population is predominantly Muslim. Approximately two kilometers south of Al-Bad' are caves known locally as "Maghā'ir Shuʿayb" (the Caves of Jethro). Modern archaeologists consider these structures to be 1st-century AD Nabatean tombs.

Local tradition also holds that "Bir al-Saidni," located in the nearby coastal town of Makna, is the well from which Moses rolled away the stone to draw water for the flocks of Jethro's daughters. The town of Makna (or Magna) lies on the Red Sea coast southwest of Al-Bad'. A Jewish community is known to have existed there from at least the 9th century AD.

Some Evangelical writers, including Bob Cornuke, Ron Wyatt, and Lennart Möller, have proposed that Jabal al-Lawz is the real biblical Mount Sinai.

== Transportation ==
=== Air ===
Al-Bad' does not have its own airport. Air travel for the governorate is primarily served by the Prince Sultan International Airport in Tabuk City, the province’s main airport.

== See also ==
- Provinces of Saudi Arabia
- List of islands of Saudi Arabia
- List of mountains in Saudi Arabia
- List of governorates of Saudi Arabia
- List of cities and towns in Saudi Arabia
