= Hala-'l Badr =

Volcano in Saudi Arabia

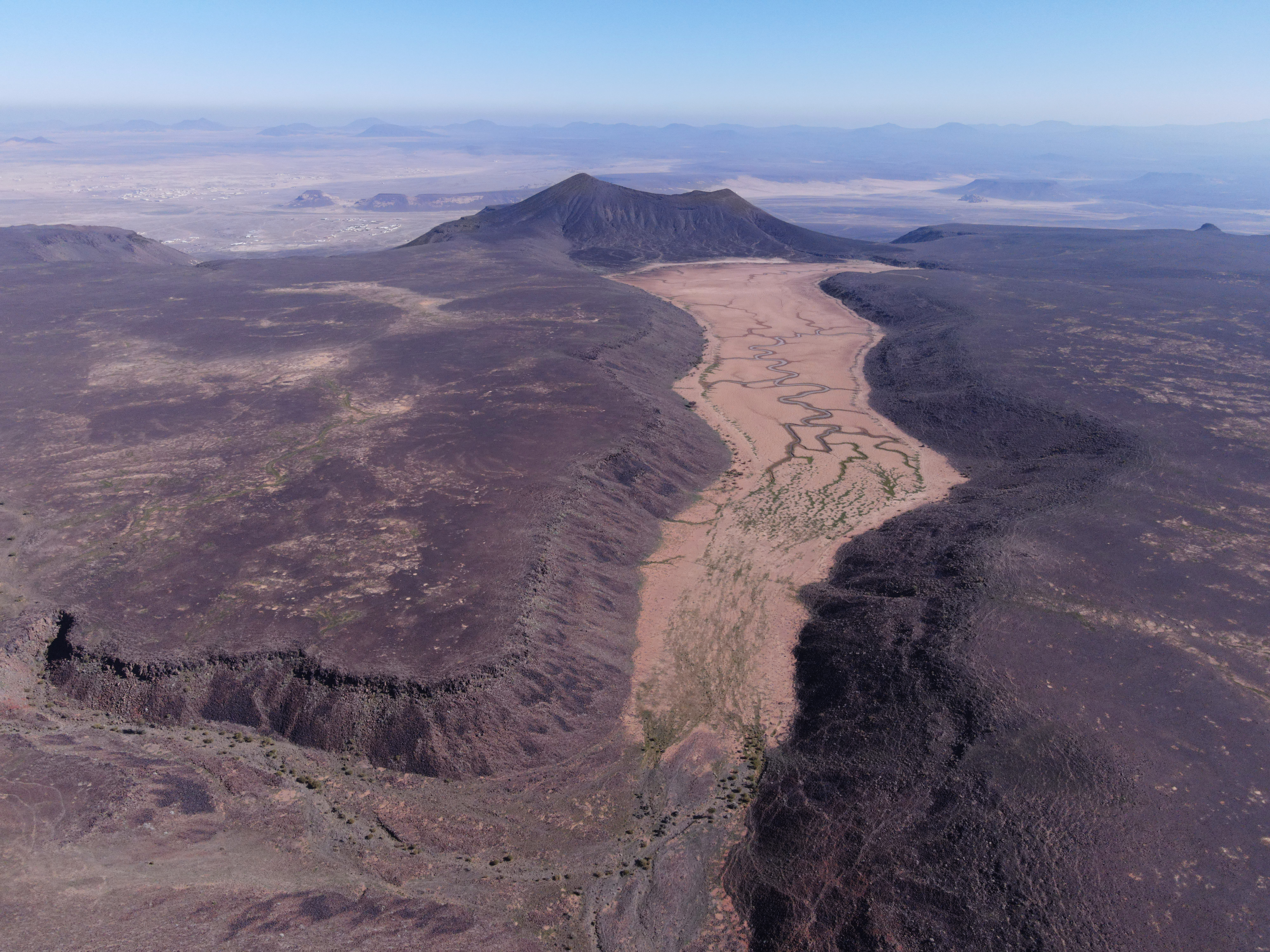
Hallat al-Badr with Thadra paleolake in foreground.

Ḥalā-'l Badr (or Hala-'l Bedr / Hallat al-Badr, in Arabic: حلا البدر, meaning "crater of the full moon") is a volcano in northwestern Saudi Arabia at 27.25° N, 37.235° E. The volcano has traditionally been classified as a parasitic cinder cone (or scoria-cone) type, and is located on the northeast corner of the Thadra table mountain in the al-Jaww (الجاوّ) basin. Al-Jaww is an erosional depression between Harrat ar-Rahah (حرة الراحة ḥarratu 'r-raḥah) and Harrat al-'Uwayrid (حرة العويد ḥarratu 'r-'ūwayrid) that is ~600 km2 and ~200 m deep. Jabal Thadra (variously spelled Tadra or Tathri/Tathra', or alternatively known as Jebel Khadir) is a volcanic plateau or table mountain composed of Paleozoic/Cambrian sandstone and a basalt pavement or capping. Jabal Thadra has an elevation of approximately 1500 m above sea level. Hallat al-Badr rises almost 100 m above the plateau's eastern escarpment and is oriented on a north-east tilted axis, hence why its lava flows have intruded northeast into the al-Jaww basin.

Badr's eruption history is currently unknown, but geological studies suggest that the volcano erupted some time during the Holocene period, and the most recent lava flows occurred in the al-Jaww basin. Badr has a Volcanic Explosivity Index (VEI) of at least 2, so it is capable of producing an eruption column at least 3 miles (4.8 km) high. Such eruptions release a tephra volume of at least 0.001 km^{3} (0.00024 cu mi) with noticeable effects on the surrounding area. For reference, a volcanic eruption with a VEI of 2 releases enough lava to fill around 400 Olympic-sized swimming pools.

Bedouin legend holds that Hallat al-Badr vomited fire and stones, killing many herdsmen and their flocks, some time around 640 CE. However, it is unknown whether this legend originated with an eruption of Hallat al-Badr or a volcano further south in Harrat Rahat, near Medina. It may also be based on earlier historical eruptions of Hallat al-Badr or a nearby volcano.

Hallat al-Badr is situated along a major 1st millennium BCE caravan trade route, known as the Darb al-Bakrah. Multiple Dedanite and Thamudic inscriptions are attested in the surrounding area, but there is also evidence for seasonal or ephemeral Neolithic and Bronze Age pastoral nomad encampments. Despite showing strong evidence of ancient domestic and ritual activities, Jabal Thadra, the volcanic plateau upon which Hallat al Badr sits, currently remains un-excavated. Archaeological features near Hallat al-Badr include standing-stone circles and burial cairns, rock carvings of cattle, a linear stone-structure that may have functioned as a desert kite for trapping animals, and multiple inscriptions or graffiti. Australian-led expeditions not far from Hallat al-Badr in Harrat 'Uwayrid have recently surveyed and excavated similar standing stone circle or "domestic" structures, which were constructed by Neolithic pastoral nomadic communities that may trace their origin to Jordan and Syria.

Located at Hallat al-Badr's southwestern base there is a 1.8 km long erosional depression in the basalt capping of the underlying paleozoic sandstones of Jabal Thadra, a feature which has been described by Jacob Dunn as a paleolake or sabkha. Dunn argues that this high-altitude paleolake in the middle of such a remote volcanic desert may have contributed to the mountain's sacred nature for nomadic desert tribes, particularly those engaged in caravan trade, such as the biblical Midianites. He also notes that this ancient shallow lake could have stored a vast amount of drinking water for desert nomads like the Midianites or Amalekites and their flocks during ritual pilgrimages or seasonal migrations, particularly during pluvials or after seasonal monsoon-driven rains. Dunn compares the Thadra paleolake to the ones discovered at Tayma and Jubbah in northwestern Saudi Arabia, both having served as important watering-holes and grazing areas for pastoral nomads and their flocks during the Neolithic and Bronze Age.

Hallat al-Badr is located in the biblical land of Midian––the Hejaz region of northwest Saudi Arabia– the geographical designation generally agreed upon by numerous biblical scholars and historians as the homeland of the biblical Midianites. Midianite pottery (also known by its more neutral term, 'Qurayyah Painted Ware' or QPW) dating to the Late Bronze Age was found not too distant from Hallat al-Badr at Tayma and Qurayyah in NW Arabia. More recent excavations have unearthed sherds of QPW at al-Bad' and further south at Dedan near Al-Ula, suggesting that the Midianites were in the right place at the right time to be geographically and historically connected with the sacred volcanic mountain.

Writers including Charles Beke, Sigmund Freud, Immanuel Velikovsky, Colin HumphreysEduard Meyer, Martin Noth, Hermann Gunkel and most recently Jacob Dunn have proposed that the biblical description of devouring fire on Mount Sinai refers to an erupting volcano in the land of biblical Midian. Gunkel writes, "The characteristic Israelite narratives of Yahweh's appearance in the burning thorn bush (Exod. 3:2), in the burning and smoking Sinai (Exod. 19:9, 20:18; Deut. 4:11), and especially in the pillars of smoke and fire (Exod. 13:21)... can be explained originally from the fact that, in Israel's earliest belief, Yahweh was the god of the Sinai volcano." This possibility would exclude all the peaks on the Sinai Peninsula and Mount Seir, but would match a number of places in northwestern Saudi Arabia. Alois Musil and Colin Humphreys have even argued that the itinerary stations given in Numbers 33 lead directly to Hallat al-Badr.

According to Jacob Dunn, the original theophany of Yahweh may derive from ancient eyewitness accounts of volcanic eruptions along the ancient trade routes passing through the lava fields (harrats) in proximity to Hallat al-Badr. Dunn notes that nearly all of the features of the theophany at Sinai or Horeb (also called the "mountain of God") may derive from volcanic phenomena, such as volcanic lightning and eruption columns.

Currently, there is no archaeological evidence confirming or denying that Hallat al-Badr is to be identified as the historical Mount Sinai described in the Hebrew Bible, but its location in the land of Midian and volcanic nature make it a possible candidate.
