= Jabal Maqla =

Mountain in Tabūk, Saudi Arabia

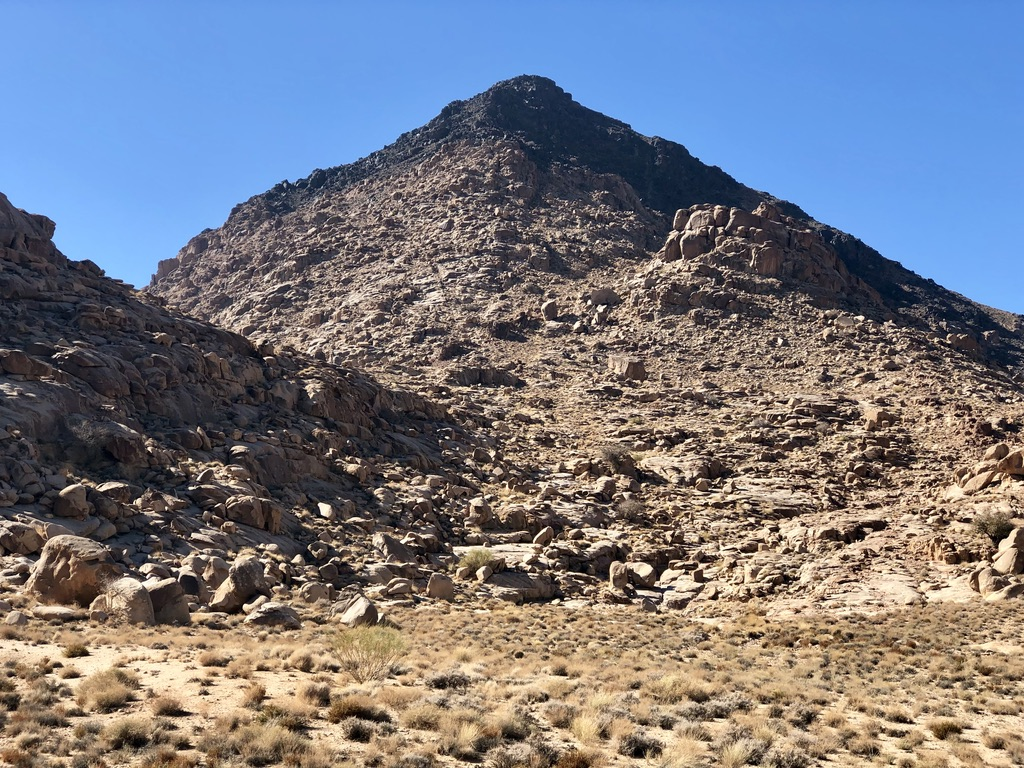

Geography
- Country: Saudi Arabia
- Province: Tabūk Province

Jabal Maqla (Arabic: جَبَل مَقْلَة, romanized: Jabal Maqlah) is a mountain located in northwest Saudi Arabia, near the Jordan border, above the Gulf of Aqaba, and is located in Tabūk Province, Saudi Arabia.

Jabal Maqla is one of the tallest mountains in the northwestern Arabian Peninsula and the estimated terrain elevation is around 2,326 metres (7,631 feet) above sea level. It is in the Madiyan Mountains. Variant forms of spelling for Jabal Maqla are: Jabal Magla', Jabal Magla, Jabal Maqla', Al-Makla, El-Maqla. Its name means Burnt Mountain, which is attributed to the black igneous rocks that cap the otherwise lighter brown coloured mountain.

The peak is located at 28.5967417°N 35.3354917°E or 28°35′48.27″N 35°20′7.77″E

At about 3,500 feet or 1 km on the north/west-facing side, is an odd light-coloured pentagon shape, of sides about 250 feet or 76 metres. The pentagon's centre is located at 28.606182°N 35.325586°E or 28°36′22.3″N 35°19′32.1″E.

The town of Al-Bad', Saudi Arabia lies to the north. The mountain is near one of the tallest in Saudi Arabia, Jabal al-Lawz, which is about 7 kilometers to the north and around 200 meters taller.

== Geology ==
The summit of Jabal Maqla consists mainly of dark-colored hornfels derived from metamorphosed volcanic rocks that originally were silicic and mafic lava flows, tuff breccias, and fragmental greenstones. The middle and lower slopes of Jabal Maqlā consist of light-colored granite, which has intruded into the overlying hornfels. This is the same granite that comprises Jabal al-Lawz. Jabal Maqla is about 7 kilometers to the south, and a few hundred meters lower.

== See also ==
- List of mountains in Saudi Arabia
