= Gansky =

Gansky is a surname. Notable people with the surname include:

- Alton Gansky (fl. from 1998), American novelist
- Diana Gansky (born 1963), German track and field athlete
- Lisa Gansky (born 1961), American entrepreneur and author
