= Varsham =

Varsham may refer to:

- Varsham (2004 film), an Indian Telugu-language romantic action film
- Varsham (2014 film), an Indian Malayalam-language drama film by Ranjith Shankar

== See also ==
- Varsha (disambiguation)
- Varusham 16, a 1989 Indian film by Fazil
- Varushamellam Vasantham, a 2002 Indian film
