= Varsho =

Varsho is a surname. Notable people with the surname include:

- Daulton Varsho (born 1996), American baseball player, son of Gary
- Gary Varsho (born 1961), American baseball player and manager

== See also ==
- Varsha (disambiguation)
