= Hamas in Lebanon =

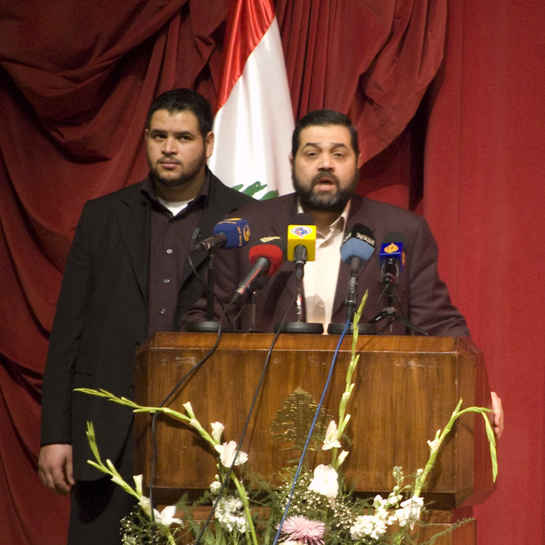
Osama Hamdan, the top representative of Hamas in Lebanon

The Hamas organization has a permanent and established presence in Lebanon. The presence gained prominence following the announcement of the formation of the Al-Aqsa Flood Vanguards unit by Hamas in Beirut in 2023.

According to Free Patriotic Movement (FPM) Leader Gebran Bassil, Hamas's establishment in Lebanon raised concerns about Lebanon's sovereignty and stability.

== History ==
The relationship between Hamas and Hezbollah has developed over the years according to L'Orient-Le Jour. Due to a mutual quest to undermine the PLO following their collaboration with Israel, the two organizations were closely aligned in certain periods.

Their relationship deteriorated following Hamas's political alliance with Turkey, a country Iran, Hezbollah's supporter, has had disagreements with. Their relationship worsened in 2011, during the Syrian uprising when Hamas supported the rebels against the government. Hezbollah was fighting with the Syrian government against the Syrian rebels which included Hamas operatives present in Syria.

Hamas and Hezbollah's relationship started to improve in more recent years following the improving bond between Iran and Turkey. Hamas has had operatives over the years in Lebanon, the improvement in the Hamas-Hezbollah-Iran relationship led to an increase in Hamas presence and power in Lebanon, reported not only as political but as military support.

Jeroen Gunning, a professor of Middle Eastern studies at Kings College in London, explained that historically, during the British administration between 1920 and 1948, the South Lebanon community and the Northern community were intertwined. Following The Israel war in 1948, Palestinians were forced to Lebanon establishing several refugee camps in Lebanon. In 1969, the Lebanese state granted the camps independence to manage their security.

Historically, Hezbollah's involvement in Lebanese politics was limited to parliamentary activities. However, the withdrawal of Israel from Lebanon in 2000 and Syria's departure in 2005 altered the political and military landscape on both regional and domestic fronts. In response, Hezbollah enhanced its involvement in Lebanese politics, officially joining the Lebanese government in 2005. While Israel's withdrawal in 2000 was hailed as the conclusive triumph for the Resistance in Lebanon, a significant challenge emerged concerning Hezbollah's disarmament, leading the movement to vehemently oppose it and even resorting to force in May 2008, pushing the nation to the brink of internal conflict.

In recent years, various Arab and international parties have passed numerous resolutions and agreements to address the stability and security of the volatile Lebanese region.

In 2004, UN Security Council Resolution 1559 was passed, ordering all armed militants to be disarmed of their weaponry. This was to allow the Lebanese state to assert its sovereignty.

According to a US State Department spokeswoman and several other sources, Hezbollah has broken the UN resolution on various occasions. Over several years Hezbollah has been reported to getting arms from Iran and building bases for the production of independent arms within Lebanon.

The Time of Israel explains the previous agreement that the Lebanese army refrains from intervening in these camps, leaving them vulnerable to the control of Palestinian parties, including Hamas.

In 2017, Yahya Sinwar took over as Hamas leader in Gaza. Sinwar, having close relations with Iran according to New Lines Magazine, repaired Hamas's relationship with Hezbollah and with Syria's President Bashar al-Assad. The restored relationship united the organization into an unofficial "unity of battlefields", meaning that any attack on one member of the alliance (such as Hamas in Gaza) would be taken as an attack on all.

In 2020, Hamas' leader, Ismail Haniyeh, was reported visiting Lebanon's Palestinian refugee camps.

In 2022, Sinwar revealed a treaty between the "Axis of Resistance". Analysts suspect a joint security room exists in Lebanon. Despite the organizations' cooperation, according to Ahmed Abdul-Hadi, the head of Hamas's political bureau in Beirut, Hamas did not inform Hezbollah before their offensive on 7 October 2023 in Israel. In a statement to Al Jazeera Arabic, Ali Baraka stated that after the attack offensive military leader Mohammed Deif appealed for support from Lebanon, Iran, Iraq, Syria, and Yemen. He revealed the existence since 2021 of a Palestinian Joint Operations Room among the various factions.

Concerns have been raised by the previous Israeli ambassador to the United Nations, Danny Danon, regarding Hezbollah's relationship with Hamas. In a letter he wrote in May 2018, he warned regarding the strengthening relationship between Hamas and Hezbollah, referring to them as "the two internationally recognized terrorist organizations.. the Iranian proxy." He refers to a previous letter he sent in 2017, where he informed the UN that Hamas has been conspiring with Hezbollah and its Teheran Sponsor in purpose to expand its activities beyond the Gaza borders. According to Danon, the cooperation between Hamas, Hezbollah, and Iran is an international threat.

=== 2023 Hamas declaration ===
On 4 December 2023, amid the Gaza war, Hamas announced the organization's official establishment in Lebanon. The Lebanon-based unit was named the "al-Aqsa Flood Vanguards unit".

Hamas's announcement called the "Palestinian people" of Lebanon and all fighters to join the group and contribute to the resistance against the Israeli regime's occupation, framing it as part of the broader struggle for the liberation of Jerusalem and the Al-Aqsa Mosque.

According to a US official reported on Sky News, Hezbollah had supplied Hamas members in Lebanon with rockets to use against Israel during the 2023 Israel–Lebanon border conflict.

=== Response ===
The establishment of the Vanguards during the 2023 Hamas-led attack on Israel faced severe criticism from various political figures and factions within Lebanon. Many argued that such an organization, with potential military implications, could infringe upon Lebanon's sovereignty and violate international resolutions, particularly the Taif Agreement. Critics, including members of the Christian Lebanese Forces Party and other political figures, voiced concerns about a potential recurrence of historical issues related to armed Palestinian factions operating from Lebanese territory.

In response to the widespread criticism, Hamas' representative in Lebanon, Ahmad Abd Al-Hadi, attempted to ease concerns by stating that the organization would not have a military character. However, conflicting statements from other Hamas sources indicated that some members might be involved in armed resistance.

Lebanese Prime Minister Najib Mikati firmly rejected the establishment of the new organization, emphasizing that it was inconceivable, and stressed that relevant elements had clarified it was not intended for military action.

An Israeli drone attack in the Dahieh neighborhood of Beirut on 2 January 2024 led to the assassination of Saleh al-Arouri, the deputy leader of Hamas's political bureau and one of the key figures behind the 7 October 2023 Hamas-led attack on Israel.

== See also ==
- List of extrajudicial killings and political violence in Lebanon
