= Hassan Baraka =

Moroccan swimmer (born 1987)

Personal information
- Born: April 10, 1987 (age 39) Tétouan, Morocco

Sport
- Sport: Swimming
- Strokes: Open water swimming

Hassan Baraka (born April 10, 1987) is a Moroccan open water swimmer.

== Career ==
Starting his continent-swimming challenge in July 2013, Baraka crossed the Strait of Gibraltar to link Europe and Africa, completing the 16.6 km swim from Spain to Morocco in 4 hours and 1 minute. He holds the distinction of being the youngest Moroccan to achieve this feat. In July 2014, he swam the Bosphorus in Turkey, covering 6.5 km in 57 minutes and 56 seconds, thereby connecting Europe and Asia. He further symbolically bridged continents by swimming 1 km between the Diomede Islands of Russia and the United States in August, followed by a 9 km swim from Papua New Guinea to Indonesia in September. In October of the same year, he completed a 28.8 km swim from Dahab, Egypt to Magna, Saudi Arabia, setting a Guinness World Record for "fastest time to swim the length of the Aqaba Gulf" (8 hours, 30 minutes, 42 seconds).

In 2024, Baraka became the first Moroccan swimmer to successfully cross the English Channel, covering a distance of 55 km, marking the biggest achievement of his career. Baraka prepared extensively over several years, participating in numerous long-distance races in varying weather conditions. He completed the Channel swim in 15 hours and 55 minutes.

Baraka is the first Moroccan to have completed the World Marathon Challenge. This challenge involves swimming seven marathons on seven continents in seven days. He holds a record in Lake Aguelmam Azegza, swimming 1600 meters in icy waters, the maximum permitted by International Ice Swimming Association guidelines.
