= Imad al-Alami =

Hamas official (1956–2018)

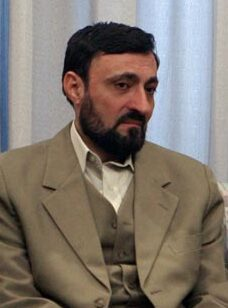
- al-Alami in 2006
- Born: 1956; Gaza City, Palestine
- Died: 30 January 2018 (aged 61–62); Al-Shifa Hospital, Gaza City
- Cause of death: Gunshot wound to head
- Other name: Abu Hammam
- Education: Alexandria University (BS)
- Occupation: Hamas senior official

Imad Khalil al-Alami (1956 – 30 January 2018), also known as Abu Hammam, was a senior Hamas official. One of the group's co-founders, he joined Hamas in the late 1980s. After being exiled in 1994, al-Alami became a key link between Gaza and the Syrian and Iranian governments, functioning as Hamas's first representative in Tehran.

Al-Alami returned to Gaza in 2012, and was the Deputy Chief in the Gaza Strip from 2013 to 2017.

== Biography ==
Al-Alami was born in Gaza City, and he earned a degree in civil engineering from Alexandria University. He joined Hamas in the late 1980s, and is considered a founding member of the group.

Al-Alami was exiled by Israel to Lebanon in 1991 or 1994. In Lebanon, al-Alami and other leaders in exile learned tactics such as suicide bombing from Hezbollah. He later went to Syria in 2008 and then Tehran and was Hamas's first representative in Iran. Along with other Hamas senior leaders Ahmed Yassin, Osama Hamdan, Khaled Mashal, Mousa Abu Marzook, and Abdel Aziz Rantisi, al-Alami was one of the original six Hamas officials designated as Specially Designated Global Terrorists by the United States on 22 August 2003.

By 2003, he had moved to Damascus, Syria. When Hamas abandoned its headquarters in Damascus over disagreements with Tehran after the outbreak of the Syrian civil war, al-Alami was the last Hamas official to leave Damascus for Gaza in a last-ditch effort to salvage the relationship. He was the point person for Hamas's relations with Iran and the Iran-aligned Axis of Resistance, and had a decades-long working relationship with Hezbollah chief Hassan Nasrallah.

From 2013 to 2017 al-Alami was the Hamas Deputy Chief in the Gaza Strip, though in November 2016 he was reported to have replaced Haniyeh as the Hamas Chief in the Gaza Strip. Due to his time in Damascus and Tehran, al-Alami had close ties to the Syrian and Iranian governments.

During the 2014 Gaza War, al-Alami was involved in ceasefire negotiations, reportedly giving voice to more militant elements of Hamas. Al-Alami lost a leg under murky circumstances, for which he traveled to Turkey after the war for treatment. Hamas claimed he had been wounded in the war. However, another claim was that he was hurt when a tunnel that he and other Hamas leaders were hiding in collapsed. Another report was that he was wounded during a gunfight among Hamas militants. While in Turkey receiving medical treatment, al-Alami continued to receive delegations on behalf of Hamas.

Though not a member of the Hamas Political Bureau, he remained a prominent figure in Hamas. Al-Alami maintained a low profile. He avoided the media spotlight, did not use social media, and did not participate in press conferences. Unlike other senior Hamas officials, al-Alami did not visit mourners' tents.

=== Death ===
On 9 January 2018, al-Alami was critically wounded. Initial reports in Hamas official media claimed al-Alami had died of natural causes on 9 January, but the movement later stated that he had shot himself in the head while inspecting his personal weapon at his home. However, some experts and commentators questioned the veracity of Hamas's account, speculating that a rival Hamas member may have shot al-Alami.

Al-Alami was left unconscious after the shooting and died three weeks later at Al-Shifa Hospital in Gaza City on 30 January.

Hundreds of Gazans, including several top Hamas officials, joined his funeral procession in Gaza City. At a funeral at the Great Mosque of Gaza, Hamas chief Ismail Haniyeh praised al-Alami, saying that "Hamas was Abu Hamam and Abu Hamam was Hamas."
