= Baraka (given name) =

Baraka is a male given name. Notable people with the surname include:

- Baraka Atkins (born 1984), American former professional footballer
- Baraka bint Thaʿlaba, known as Umm Ayman, a disciple of Muhammad
- Baraka Majogoro (born 1996), Tanzanian footballer
- Barack Obama, Sr. (1934–1982), born Baraka Obama, Kenyan father of U.S. President Barack Obama

== See also ==
- Baraka
