= Jabal al-Lawz =

Ultra-prominent mountain in Saudi Arabia

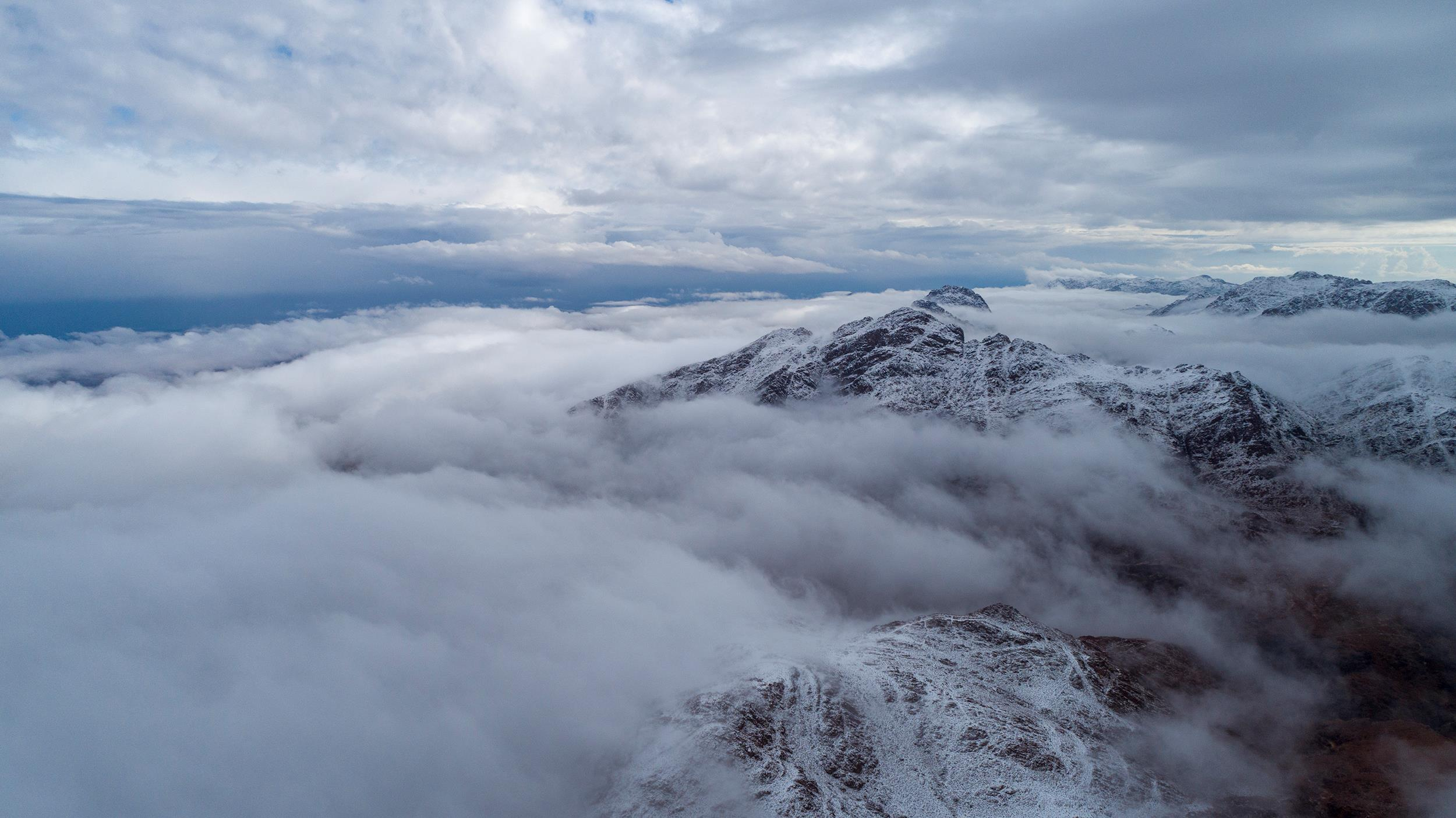

Highest point
- Elevation: 2,556 m (8,386 ft)
- Prominence: 1,598 m (5,243 ft)
- Listing: Ultra, Ribu
- Coordinates: 28°39′15″N 35°18′14″E

Naming
- Native name: جَبَل ٱللَّوْز (Arabic)
- English translation: Mountain of almonds

Geography
- Location within Saudi Arabia
- Location: Saudi Arabia

Jabal al-Lawz (Arabic: جَبَل ٱللَّوْز) is a mountain in the ancient region of Midian in northwest Saudi Arabia, near the Jordanian border, above the Gulf of Aqaba, at 2,580 metres (8,460 feet) above sea level. The name means 'mountain of almonds'. The peak of Jabal al-Lawz consists of a light-colored, calc-alkaline granite that is intruded by rhyolite and andesite dikes which generally trend eastward.

== Flora ==
Between 1300 and 2200 meters elevation, Jabal al-Lawz has relict Mediterranean woodlands of Juniperus phoenicea, with an understory of Achillea santolinoides, Artemisia sieberi, and Astracantha (or Astragalus) echinus subsp. arabica.

== Jabal al-Lawz and Jabal Maqla ==
In discussions about the location of biblical Mount Sinai, Jabal Maqla ('Burnt Mountain') is believed to be Jabal al-Lawz by various authors such as Bob Cornuke, Ron Wyatt, and Lennart Möller as shown by local and regional maps and noted by other investigators. In contrast to the real Jabal al-Lawz, the summit of Jabal Maqla consists mainly of dark-colored hornfels derived from metamorphosed volcanic rocks that originally were silicic and mafic lava flows, tuff breccias, and fragmental greenstones. The middle and lower slopes of Jabal Maqla consist of light-colored granite, which has intruded into the overlying hornfels. This is the same granite that comprises Jabal al-Lawz. Jabal Maqla is about 7 kilometers to the south, and a few hundred meters lower.

Claims made by some writers, including Bob Cornuke, Ron Wyatt, and Lennart Möller, that Jabal Maqla, possibly identified as Jabal al-Lawz, is the real biblical Mount Sinai have been rejected by such scholars as James Karl Hoffmeier (Professor of Old Testament and Ancient Near Eastern History and Archaeology), who details what he calls Cornuke's "monumental blunders".

Remains both of pillars and cairns at the site of Jabal al-Lawz have been described as "similar to rock cairns of uncertain use and often uncertain date found at other sites throughout northern and western Arabia."

== See also ==
- List of mountains in Saudi Arabia
- List of ultras of West Asia (ultra prominent peaks)
