= Makna, Saudi Arabia =

Town in Tabuk province, Saudi Arabia

Coordinates: 28°24′N 34°45′E

Tabuk region

Makna, also known as Magna, is a town in Tabuk Province of Saudi Arabia. Located at 28° 23' 51"N and 34° 44' 59"E. it is on the coast of Gulf of Aqaba southwest of Al-Bad', Saudi Arabia. It lies on the border of the Hejaz region, and was in antiquity in southern Midian. The Red Sea near Makna holds pristine coral reefs and is renowned as a scuba dive site.
