= Osama Hamdan =

Palestinian diplomat (born 1965)

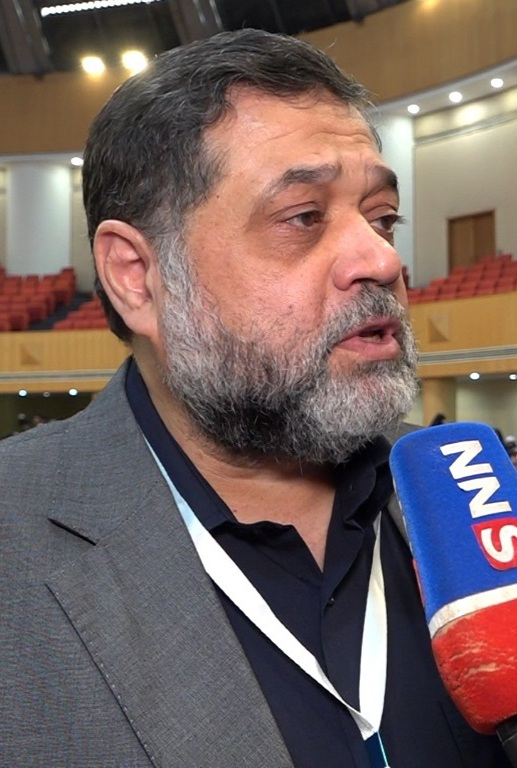
- Hamdan in 2024

Hamas Representative in Lebanon
- In office 1998–2009
- Succeeded by: Ali Baraka

Hamas Representative in Tehran
- In office 1993–1998

Personal details
- Born: 1965 (age 60–61) Bureij refugee camp, Gaza Strip
- Party: Hamas

Osama Hamdan (Arabic: أسامة حمدان; born 1965) is a Palestinian diplomat and former senior representative of Hamas in Lebanon and Tehran. He previously held the position of Head of International Relations Department for Hamas and Chair of the Political Committee of the Palestinian Legislative Council.

== Early life ==
Hamdan was born in the Bureij refugee camp in the Gaza Strip, in 1965, to a Palestinian refugee family that fled the village of al-Batani al-Sharqi during the 1948 Arab-Israeli War. He attended high school in Kuwait, graduating in 1982. He then enrolled at the Yarmouk University in Irbid, Jordan where he graduated with a bachelor's degree in chemistry in 1986. While he was at university, Hamdan became an activist with the Islamic student movement on campus.

== Career ==
After graduating university, Hamdan worked in the industrial sector in Kuwait until the Gulf War in 1990.

From 1992 to 1993, Hamdan worked at the Hamas office in Tehran as assistant to then Hamas representative Imad al-Alami. He became Hamas' official representative in Iran in 1994, serving in that post until 1998. While undertaking this post, Hamdan said that the "flourishing relations" between Iran and Hamas were at the expense of the once-good relationship between Iran and the Palestinian Liberation Organization (PLO). However, he stated "There is an absence of any proof or evidence of Iranian financial support to Hamas, Islamic Jihad and other Palestinian factions who have established contacts with Iran. It is merely rumours and speculation."

In 1998, Hamdan was appointed as Hamas representative in Lebanon, a post he retains as of 2024. In 2004, he served as Hamas' spokesman in Cairo during a dialogue between Palestinian factions. He has also participated in talks between Hamas and European officials. Hamdan has advocated Palestinian unity talks and in an interview with Al-Arabiya on May 20, 2009, he said "I understand that each of us [Hamas and Fatah] must set conditions to reach an agreement. National dialogue must be based on national interests of the Palestinian people..."

In an interview which aired on Al-Jadid/New TV on May 4, 2011, as translated by MEMRI, Hamdan stated that "politically, the two-state solution is over" and that "we are entering the phase of the liberation of Palestine... the notion of Return: the return of the refugees to their homeland, and the return of the Israelis to the countries from which they came."

In a 2014 interview which aired on the Hamas-affiliated Al-Quds TV channel as translated by MEMRI, Hamdan stated that "killing children...is engraved in the historical Zionist and Jewish mentality." Commenting on the accusation of blood libel against Jews, Hamdan stated "we all remember how the Jews used to slaughter Christians, in order to mix their blood in their holy matzos. This is not a figment of imagination or something taken from a film. It is a fact, acknowledged by their own books and by historical evidence." In a subsequent interview with CNN's Wolf Blitzer, Hamdan defended his comments, stating that he was responding to comments made by Moshe Feiglin in the Israeli Knesset in which he called for the "complete destruction of the Palestinians in Gaza". Hamdan asserted that the organisation MEMRI had edited and 'cut' his words in a selective manner taking them out of context, going on to remark that "we are not against Jews, we are against the Israeli occupation".

He served as a top advisor to Ismail Haniyeh, former leader of the Hamas Political Bureau.

=== 2023 Gaza war ===
During the Gaza war, Hamdan acted as a media representative for Hamas, appearing from Lebanon across multiple platforms and channels internationally for interview and comment across various issues. In March 2025, Hamdan and top ranking Hamas officials Taher al-Nono and Basem Naim negotiated with the envoy of American President Donald Trump, including Adam Boehler, for a ceasefire deal and resolution to the Gaza war hostage crisis. Boehler and Hamas unsuccessfully discussed a deal to free the Israeli-American soldier and hostage Edan Alexander. In a May 2025 interview with Drop Site News, Hamdan stated that the negotiations with Boehler were productive, but that Israel ultimately sabotaged and derailed these efforts.

== Sanctions ==
Since 2001, Hamas has been subject to international sanctions under United Nations Security Council Resolution 1373 and Hamadan is one of several Hamas leaders sanctioned under the resolution. Since the adoption of Resolution 1373, he has been sanctioned by Australia's Department of Foreign Affairs and Trade subjecting him to a travel ban from the country.

Hamdan was sanctioned by the United States in 2003 as a Specially Designated Global Terrorist by United States Department of the Treasury in response to the Shmuel HaNavi bus bombing.

In 2020, Hamdan was sanctioned by the United Kingdom's Foreign, Commonwealth and Development Office and Office of Financial Sanctions Implementation of HM Treasury subjecting him to a travel ban from the country.
