= Barkha =

Barkha may refer to:

== People ==
- Barkha Dutt, an Indian journalist
- Barkha Madan, an Indian actress and former model
- Barkha Sengupta, an Indian actress
- Barkha Sharma, an Indian fashion designer
- Barkha Singh, an Indian actress

== Entertainment ==
- Barkha (1960 film), an Indian film
- Barkha Bahar, a 1973 Indian film
- Barkhaa, a 2015 Indian film

== See also ==
- Varsha (disambiguation), etymon of the name
- Barka (disambiguation)
- Baraka (disambiguation)
