= Baraka =

Baraka or Barakah may refer to:

== Places ==
- Baraka, Democratic Republic of the Congo, a town in the eastern Congolese province of Sud-Kivu on Lake Tanganyika.
- Baraka, Gabon, a site where American missionaries from New England established a mission in 1842 on what is now Libreville
- Baraka River, Eritrea and Sudan
- Baraka School, an educational program in Kenya, featured in the film The Boys of Baraka
- Barakeh, Hama, Syria, also spelt Barakah

== People ==
- Baraka (given name)
- Baraka (surname)
- Andres Fernandes Gonçalves, better known as Baraka (born 1986), Brazilian footballer

== Arts and entertainment ==
=== Music ===
- Baraka (album), a 1997 album by DKV Trio
- Barakah (album), a 2016 album by Sami Yusuf

=== Fictional characters ===
- Baraka (Mortal Kombat), a fictional character in the Mortal Kombat series
- Baraka, the Ancient Name of Xilonen, a character in 2020 video game Genshin Impact

=== Other uses in arts and entertainment ===
- Baraka (film), a 1992 experimental documentary film by Ron Fricke
- Baraka (novel), a 1983 novel by John Ralston Sau

== Other uses ==
- Al-Barakah (ISIL administrative district), a self-proclaimed district and former province
- Barakah or Baraka, in Islam, the beneficent force from God that flows through the physical and spiritual spheres
- Barakah nuclear power plant, in the United Arab Emirates

== See also ==
- Al Baraka (disambiguation)
- Barack (disambiguation)
- Barak (disambiguation)
- Barakamon, a Japanese manga series
- Barakat (disambiguation)
- Barka (disambiguation)
- Barkha (disambiguation)
- Berakhah, in Judaism, a blessing usually recited during a ceremony
- Har Brakha, an Israeli settlement in the West Bank, Palestinian territories
