= Varsha =

Varsha may refer to:

- Varsha (season), the monsoon season in the Hindu calendar.
- Varsha (genus), an insect genus in the tribe Empoascini
- Varsha (film), a 2005 Kannada-language Indian feature film directed by S. Narayan.
- Bob Varsha (born 1951), American sports announcer
- Varsha (given name), feminine given name
- Varsha (Telugu actress), Indian actress

== See also ==
- Barsha (disambiguation)
- Barkha (disambiguation)
