= Ali Baraka =

Senior Hamas official

Head of Hamas Department of National Relations Abroad
- Incumbent
- Assumed office 2019

Hamas Representative in Lebanon
- In office 2011–2019
- Preceded by: Osama Hamdan
- Succeeded by: Ahmed Abd al-Hadi

Ali Abed Al Rahman Baraka (Arabic: علي بركة) is a senior Hamas official based in Beirut, Lebanon. As the Palestinian militant group's head of Department of National Relations Abroad Baraka oversees the group's foreign relations. He was previously the Hamas representative in Lebanon from 2011 to 2019.

Baraka is sanctioned by the U.S. and the United Kingdom for involvement in facilitating Hamas' militant activities targeting civilians, such as the October 7 attacks.

== Biography ==
Baraka was the Hamas representative in Lebanon from 2011 to 2019.

In Lebanon, Baraka was responsible for Hamas's relations with Hezbollah and Iran. Amid allegations that Hamas was supporting Syrian rebels in the Syrian Civil War, Hezbollah ordered Baraka leave Lebanon. However, Baraka remained in Lebanon. In 2016, Baraka met with an Iranian delegation at the Iranian embassy in Beirut to discuss Hamas-Iranian relations. According to the Palestine Chronicle, Iran has provided funding to Hamas.

After Hamas attacked Israel on October 7, 2023, Baraka claimed that the group had been planning the operation for 2 years. Baraka told Reuters that Hamas had long relied on money and training from Iran and the rest of Resistance Axis while Hamas was building its capabilities in Gaza.

In a statement to Al Jazeera Arabic, Baraka stated that after the attack Hamas military leader Mohammed Deif appealed for support from Lebanon, Iran, Iraq, Syria, and Yemen. He revealed the existence since 2021 of a Palestinian Joint Operations Room among the various factions.

Since 2019, Baraka has been the Palestinian militant group's head of Department of National Relations Abroad, overseeing the group's foreign relations, principally based in Beirut.

== International Sanctions ==
On 13 December 2023, Baraka was one of eight Hamas officials and facilitators targeted with U.S. sanctions for "perpetuat[ing] Hamas's violent agenda by representing the group’s interests abroad and managing its finances." On the same day, in close coordination with US authorities, the UK also imposed restrictions on Baraka, making him subject to a travel ban and assets freeze, citing his vocal support of the taking of hostages.

These restrictions were put in place in response to the October 7 Hamas attacks in order to hinder the group's access to funding and further isolate it on the international arena.

On 3 September 2024, the U.S. Department of Justice announced criminal charges against Baraka, together with five other top leaders of Hamas, for orchestrating the 7 October attack on Israel. The charges, which were filed under seal in February 2024, include conspiracy to provide material support to a foreign terrorist organization and conspiracy to murder U.S. nationals.
