= Berkeh-ye Khalaf =

Berkeh-ye Khalaf بركه خلف
- Village
- Location within Iran
- Coordinates: 26°51′56″N 56°08′03″E
- Country: Iran
- Province: Hormozgan
- County: Qeshm
- Bakhsh: Shahab
- Rural District: Suza

Population (2006)
  - Total: 314
- Time zone: UTC+3:30 (IRST)
  - Summer (DST): UTC+4:30 (IRDT)

Berkeh-ye Khalaf (Persian: بركه خلف) is a village in Suza Rural District, Shahab District, Qeshm County, Hormozgan Province, Iran. At the 2006 census, its population was 314, in 63 families.
