= Berkeh-ye Mollai =

Berkeh-ye Mollai بركه ملايي
- Village
- Location within Iran
- Coordinates: 27°31′42″N 53°13′25″E
- Country: Iran
- Province: Fars
- County: Lamerd
- Bakhsh: Alamarvdasht
- Rural District: Kheyrgu

Population (2006)
  - Total: 101
- Time zone: UTC+3:30 (IRST)
  - Summer (DST): UTC+4:30 (IRDT)

Berkeh-ye Mollai (Persian: بركه ملايي, also Romanized as Berkeh-ye Mollā’ī; also known as Berkeh-ye Mollā) is a village in Kheyrgu Rural District, Alamarvdasht District, Lamerd County, Fars province, Iran. At the 2006 census, its population was 101, in 25 families.
