= Berkeh Lari =

Berkeh Lari بركه لاري
- Village
- Location within Iran
- Coordinates: 27°12′43″N 54°42′58″E
- Country: Iran
- Province: Hormozgan
- County: Bastak
- Bakhsh: Central
- Rural District: Deh Tall

Population (2006)
  - Total: 713
- Time zone: UTC+3:30 (IRST)
  - Summer (DST): UTC+4:30 (IRDT)

Berkeh Lari (Persian: بركه لاري, also Romanized as Berkeh Lārī, Barkeh Lari, and Berkeh-ye Lārī) is a village in Deh Tall Rural District, in the Central District of Bastak County, Hormozgan Province, Iran. At the 2006 census, its population was 713, in 162 families.
