= Lennart Möller =

Swedish medical researchers (1954–2021)

Lennart Möller (24 September 1954 – 19 November 2021) was a professor of environmental medicine at the Karolinska Institute in Stockholm, Sweden. He received a doctorate in medical sciences from the Karolinska Institute in 1988, with a thesis titled "2-nitrofluorene, in vivo metabolism and assessment of cancer risk of an air pollutant". Möller was the editor and author of several books in popular sciences and theology on urban air quality, cancer, environmental medicine, ethics, and photography. He was the deputy chairman of the board for the Lennart Nilsson Award, an international prize in scientific photography.

Möller was a signatory to A Scientific Dissent From Darwinism, a 2001 public relations exercise by the Discovery Institute, a creationist group based in Seattle, Washington. The statement expresses skepticism about whether random mutations and natural selection account for the complexity of life and encourages careful examination of the evidence for "Darwinism", a term intelligent design proponents use to refer to evolution. The statement's claims have been rejected by the scientific community.

Möller was the author of The Exodus Case, a 448-page book based on findings by Ron Wyatt published in 2002 and revised and expanded in 2008. The book expounds Möller's theory about the route of the biblical Exodus from Egypt, in particular that a mountain called Jabal al-Lawz in Saudi Arabia is the biblical Mount Sinai. In a review, Swedish archaeologist Martin Rundkvist wrote, "Möller emphasizes that he is neither a theologian, a historian nor an archaeologist", and concludes, "The Exodus Case is such an extreme example of pseudo-science that any reasonably well-informed reader will wonder if Möller is joking." A review on the Studiengemeinschaft Wort und Wissen (Word and Knowledge Study Community) website, whose members take a literal approach to the Bible, said the book contained such "serious substantive and methodological errors" that it could not be recommended while agreeing that the Exodus took place. Peter van der Veen and Uwe Zerbst specifically criticized Möller's identification of Jabal al-Lawz with Mount Sinai and several of the geographical locations he thought were part of the Exodus route.

== Biographical details ==
Möller was born 24 September 1954 in Stockholm and died 19 November 2021 in Stallarholmen.
