= Barakeh, Divandarreh =

Barakeh بركه
- Village
- Location within Iran
- Coordinates: 35°53′34″N 47°06′28″E
- Country: Iran
- Province: Kurdistan
- County: Divandarreh
- Bakhsh: Central
- Rural District: Howmeh

Population (2006)
  - Total: 130
- Time zone: UTC+3:30 (IRST)
  - Summer (DST): UTC+4:30 (IRDT)

Barakeh (Persian: بركه, also Romanized as Barkeh) is a village in Howmeh Rural District, in the Central District of Divandarreh County, Kurdistan Province, Iran. At the 2006 census, its population was 130, in 25 families. The village is populated by Kurds.
