= Berkeh-ye Sefid =

Berkeh-ye Sefid بركه سفيد
- Village
- Location within Iran
- Coordinates: 27°42′41″N 52°55′48″E
- Country: Iran
- Province: Fars
- County: Lamerd
- Bakhsh: Alamarvdasht
- Rural District: Alamarvdasht

Population (2006)
  - Total: 91
- Time zone: UTC+3:30 (IRST)
  - Summer (DST): UTC+4:30 (IRDT)

Berkeh-ye Sefid (Persian: بركه سفيد, also Romanized as Berkeh-ye Sefīd) is a village in Alamarvdasht Rural District, Alamarvdasht District, Lamerd County, Fars province, Iran. At the 2006 census, its population was 91, in 15 families.
