= Foreign relations of Hamas =

Hamas, which as of 2023 had been the governing authority of the Gaza Strip, has foreign relations that spans various countries around the world. As of 2023, Mousa Abu Marzook is the group's head of international relations office.

== Africa ==
=== Egypt ===
Egypt under Mohamed Morsi who was in power from 2011 to 2013, supported Hamas.

=== South Africa ===
Hamas sent an official delegation to South Africa for the 10th anniversary of the death of Nelson Mandela, joining African National Congress minister Lindiwe Zulu at a wreath-laying event on 5 December 2023.

=== Sudan ===
Sudan under President Omar al-Bashir was a major supporter and provided Hamas its rockets.

== Americas ==
=== Venezuela ===
The relations between Venezuela and Hamas have become closer under the presidencies of Hugo Chávez and Nicolás Maduro.

=== United States ===
In early 2025, the US' Special Envoy for Hostage Affairs, Adam Boehler, talked directly with Hamas in an attempt to secure the release of American hostages. Secretary of State Marco Rubio told reporters that the talks were a "one-off situation in which our special envoy for hostages, whose job it is to get people released, had an opportunity to talk directly to someone who has control over these people and was given permission and encouraged to do so. He did so."

== Asia ==
=== China ===
After Hamas' victory in the 2006 Palestinian legislative elections, China called the group the elected representatives of the Palestinian people. The PRC invited the Hamas Foreign Minister Mahmoud al-Zahar to attend the China-Arab Cooperation Forum in June 2006 ignoring protests by both the United States and Israel but received praise from Mahmoud Abbas.

On 19 March 2024, Chinese Foreign Ministry ambassador Wang Kejian met with Hamas leader Ismail Haniyeh in Qatar, where they "exchanged views on the Gaza conflict and other issues". Following talks mediated by China, on 23 July 2024, Palestinian factions including Hamas and Fatah reached an agreement to end their divisions and form an interim unity government, which they announced in the Beijing Declaration.

=== Lebanon ===
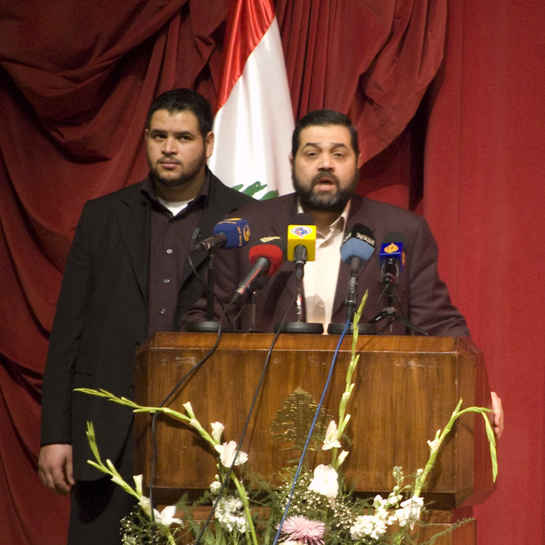
Osama Hamdan, the top representative of Hamas in Lebanon

The Hamas organization has a permanent and established presence in Lebanon. The presence gained prominence following the announcement of the formation of the Al-Aqsa Flood Vanguards unit by Hamas in Beirut in 2023.

According to Free Patriotic Movement (FPM) Leader Gebran Bassil, Hamas's establishment in Lebanon raised concerns about Lebanon's sovereignty and stability.

=== Iran ===
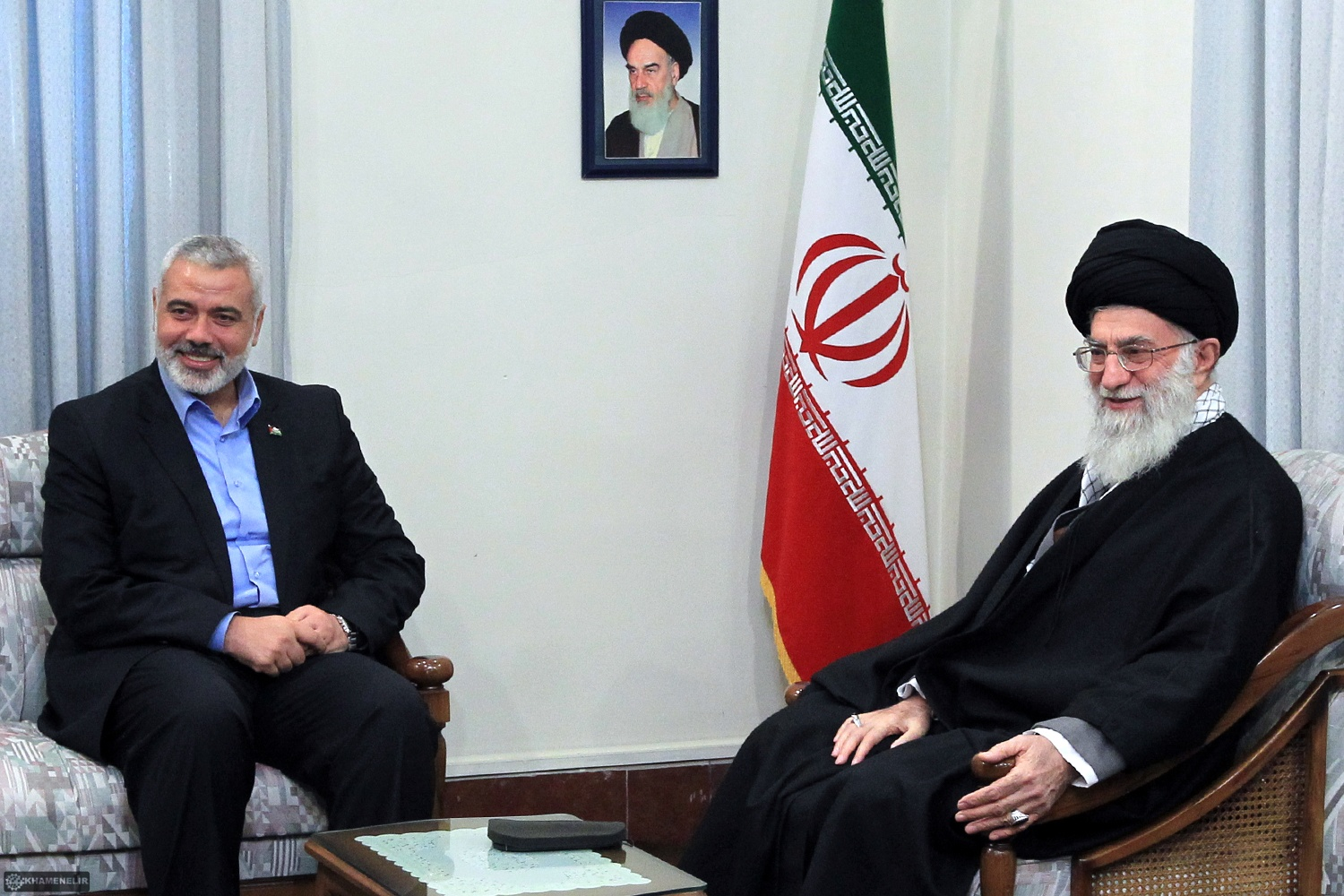
Hamas leader Ismail Haniyeh and Iranian supreme leader Ali Khamenei in 2012.

Since the early 1990s, the Islamic Republic of Iran has been sponsoring Hamas with military aid, training and financial aid. Iran has remained a key patron of Hamas, providing them with funds, weapons, and training.

According to a 2020 US Department of State report, Iran provides about $100 million annually to Palestinian militant groups, including Hamas. As of 2023, according to an Israeli security source, Iran had significantly increased its funding for Hamas to $350 million a year.

=== Israel ===
Islamists appeared to be more interested in studying the Quran than fighting Israel when Israel first came into contact with them in Gaza in the 1970s and 1980s. Mujama al-Islamiya, a forerunner of Hamas, was recognized by the Israeli authorities and registered as a charity. Members of the Mujama were able to establish an Islamic university as well as mosques, clubs, and schools. Importantly, Israel frequently took a back seat to the Islamists' sometimes deadly power struggles with their secular, left-wing Palestinian counterparts in Gaza and the West Bank. David Hacham, an Israeli military Arab relations specialist who operated in Gaza in the late 1980s and early 1990s, says, "When I look back at the chain of events, I think we made a mistake." However, none at the time considered the outcomes that might occur." On the extent to which their own actions may have helped to Hamas's rise, Israeli officials who served in Gaza disagree. They attribute the recent growth of the group to outside forces, mainly Iran. The Israeli government holds the same opinion.

=== Qatar ===
Qatar has been a key financial supporter of the Palestinian militant organization Hamas, transferring more than $1.8 billion to Hamas over the years. In consultation with the U.S. and Israeli governments, $30 million were transferred monthly to Hamas, according to a Qatari official interviewed by Der Spiegel in 2023. The United States requested in 2011 that Qatar provide a base for the Hamas leadership to ease communications with the group. From 2012, Qatar hosted the Hamas party leadership when Hamas head Khaled Mashal relocated from Syria to Qatar. Ismail Haniyeh, who succeeded Mashal as political head of Hamas, had also resided in Doha as of 2016. Qatar has been called Hamas' most important financial backer and foreign ally.

From 2018 to 2023, Israel's government enabled and approved Qatari support for Hamas for political reasons. In May 2024, it was reported that the United States had urged Qatar to remove Hamas leaders from its territory if they declined to agree to a hostage deal with Israel. Later, it was reported that Qatar was reviewing the future of Hamas' office in Doha as part of a broader evaluation of its role as a mediator in the Gaza war. In November 2024, reports emerged that Qatar had ended its mediation between Israel and Hamas and ordered the group to leave the country following U.S. pressure, after another Hamas rejection of a ceasefire deal; however, both Qatar and Hamas denied the claims.

=== Syria ===
The Syrian Arab Republic was a staunch supporter of Hamas until 2011 with the outbreak of the Syrian civil war. In January 2012, Hamas sided with the Syrian rebels against the government Bashar al-Assad. Since 2022, relations have been restored and the support was renewed. Since 2022, Hamas is again part of the regional Axis of Resistance. In December 2024, the Assad regime collapsed following an offensive by the Syrian opposition. In April 2025, it was reported that Syrian president Ahmed al-Sharaa freed Hamas and Islamic Jihad members who were detained under Assad.

=== Turkey ===
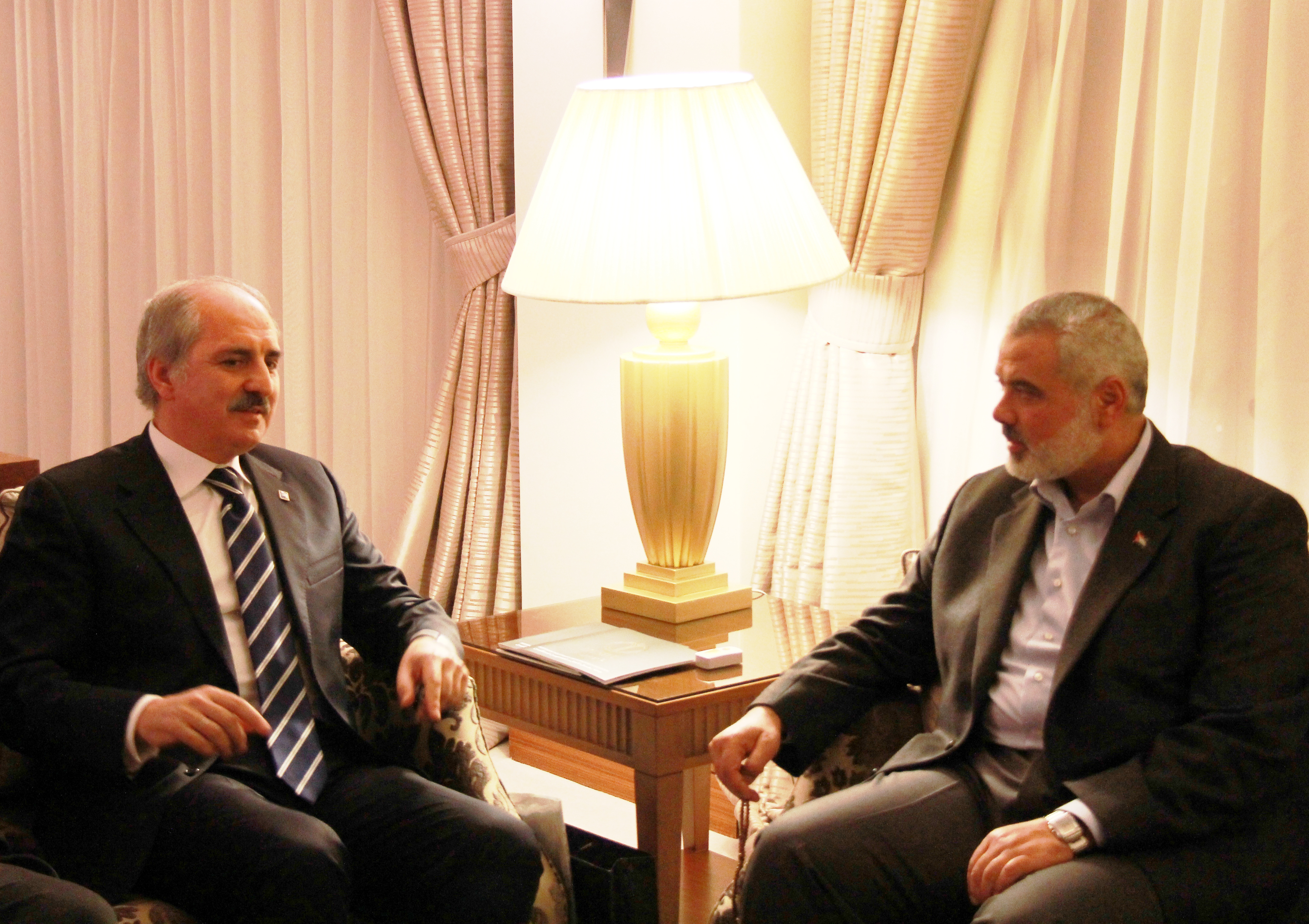
Ismail Haniyeh with Turkish Minister of Culture Numan Kurtulmuş, 20 November 2012

As part of Turkey's objective to play a neutral role in the region, the country tries to be on speaking terms with both Israel and Hamas. From time to time, Israel has suggested Turkey to support Hamas, while in other cases it has opposed the support.

Under the conservative leader Recep Tayyip Erdoğan, Turkey has become a stalwart supporter of the Palestinian militant group Hamas, which rules the Gaza Strip.

Unlike Israel, Turkey has never listed Hamas as a terrorist organisation. In 2010, Prime Minister Recep Tayyip Erdoğan described Hamas as "resistance fighters who are struggling to defend their land". Israel later said that in the same way it condemned the PKK and listed it as a terrorist organization, it expected Turkey to do the same for Hamas. Turkey hosts senior Hamas officials, including Saleh al-Arouri. Hamas head Ismail Haniyeh and former chief Khaled Mashal visit Turkey often.

According to Israel's Shin Bet, Hamas has established a command post in Turkey which it uses to recruit operatives and oversee operations in the Middle East. Hamas' Turkey branch reportedly takes decisions without taking into account the movement as a whole and without involving the Hamas leadership. Hamas has reportedly planned attacks against Israel from Turkey, including the abduction and killing of three Israeli teenagers in 2014. In 2020 Israeli diplomats charged Turkey with furnishing passports and identity cards to Hamas members in Istanbul.

The Turkish government met with Hamas leaders in February 2006, after the organization's victory in the Palestinian elections.

== Europe ==
=== Russia ===
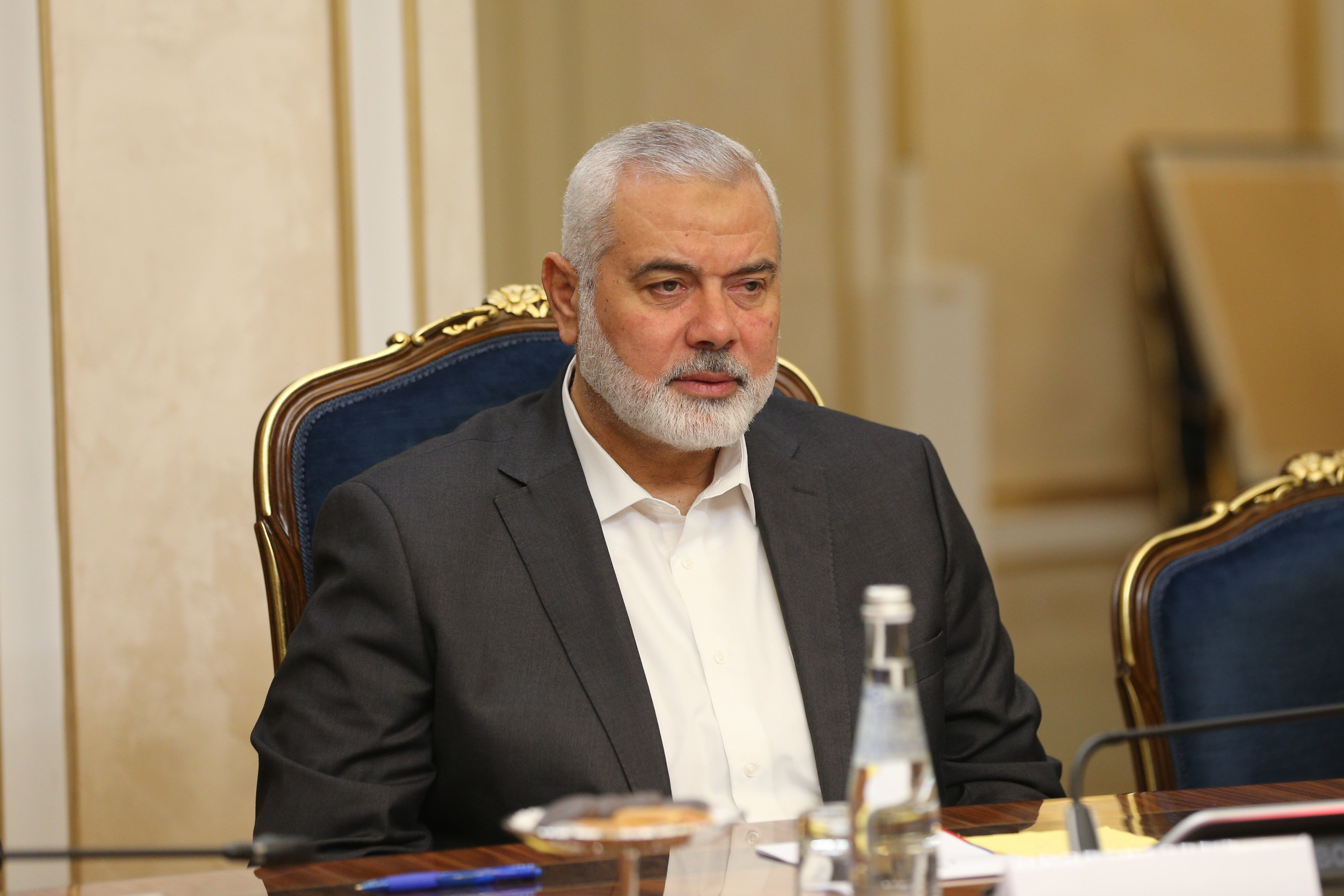
Hamas leader Ismail Haniyeh at a meeting with Russian officials in Moscow in 2022

Russia has diplomatic relations with the political wing of Hamas, the Palestinian Islamist organization which rules the Gaza Strip. Russia has not designated Hamas as a terrorist organization, though it has condemned Hamas attacks as "terrorism" and has taken a hard line against Islamist terrorism. Russia has also maintained relations with Israel.

== Legal issues ==
=== Terrorist designation ===
Entity	Designated as terrorist org.	Comments
Argentina	Yes	The government of President Javier Milei designated Hamas and its military wing as a terrorist organization in July 2024.
Australia	Yes	Australia announced they would designate Hamas as a terrorist organization in its entirety in 2022. Prior to that, Hamas's military wing, the Izz ad-Din al-Qassam Brigades, were recognized as one but the political branch were not.
Brazil	No	Brazil does not designate Hamas as a terrorist organization. The Brazilian government only classifies organizations as terrorists when the United Nations does so.
Canada	Yes	Under the Anti-Terrorism Act, the Government of Canada has listed Hamas as a terrorist entity, thus establishing it as a terrorist group, since 2002.
China	No	As of 2006, China does not designate Hamas to be a terrorist organization and acknowledges Hamas to be the legitimately elected political entity in the Gaza Strip that represents the Palestinian people. In June 2006, a spokesperson for the Chinese Foreign Ministry stated: "We believe that the Palestinian government is legally elected by the people there and it should be respected."
Egypt	No	In March 2014, as part of a crackdown on the Muslim Brotherhood organization following the July 2013 overthrow of Mohamed Morsi, Cairo's Urgent Matters Court outlawed Hamas's activities in Egypt, ordered the closure of its offices and to arrest any Hamas member found in the country. In February 2015, the aforementioned court designated Hamas as a terrorist organization, accusing Hamas of carrying terrorist attacks in Egypt through tunnels linking the Sinai Peninsula to the Gaza Strip. In June 2015, Egypt's appeals court overturned the prior ruling that listed Hamas as a terrorist organization, and Egypt (as of 2023) no longer officially regards Hamas to be a terrorist organization.
European Union	Yes	The EU designated Hamas as a terrorist group from 2003. In December 2014, the General Court of the European Union ordered that Hamas be removed from the register. The court stated that the move was technical and was not a reassessment of Hamas's classification as a terrorist group. In March 2015, EU decided to keep Hamas on its terrorism blacklist "despite a controversial court decision", appealing the court's judgment. In July 2017, this appeal was upheld by the European Court of Justice.
India	No	Hamas is not regarded as a terrorist organization by India, though individual Indian leaders have condemned certain Hamas' attacks as terrorist.
Iran	No	Hamas is not regarded as a terrorist organization by Iran.
Israel	Yes	The Israeli Ministry of Foreign Affairs states, "Hamas maintains a terrorist infrastructure in Gaza and the West Bank, and acts to carry out terrorist attacks in the territories and Israel."
Japan	Yes	As of 2005, Japan had frozen the assets of 472 terrorists and terrorist organizations including those of Hamas. In 2006 it publicly acknowledged that Hamas had won the 2006 Palestinian legislative elections democratically.
Jordan	No	Hamas was banned in 1999, reportedly in part at the request of the United States, Israel, and the Palestinian Authority. In 2019, Jordanian sources are said to have revealed "that the Kingdom refused a request from the General Secretariat of the Arab League in late March to ban Hamas and list it as a terrorist organization."
New Zealand	Yes	The military wing of Hamas, the Izz al-Din al-Qassam Brigades, has been listed as a terrorist entity since 2010. New Zealand PM Chris Hipkins reiterated in October 2023 that "Hamas is recognised by New Zealand as a terrorist organisation". In February 2024, the Government designated the entire Hamas organisation as a terrorist entity.
Norway	No	Norway does not list Hamas as a terrorist organization. Norway distanced itself from the European Union in 2006, claiming that its listing was causing problems for its role as a 'neutral facilitator.' After Progress Party leader Sylvi Listhaug criticized PM Jonas Gahr Støre at the start of the Gaza war for not calling Hamas a terrorist organization, Støre said that it was an organization that carried out terrorist acts but he would not change Norway's listing.
Organization of American States	Yes	In 2021, the Organization of American States published a statement in which it designated Hamas a terrorist organization. The statement did not receive full support from Argentina, Bolivia, Mexico, and Venezuela.
Paraguay	Partial	The military wing of Hamas, the Izz ad-Din al-Qassam Brigades, is listed as a terrorist organization.
Philippines	Yes	The National Security Council has designated Hamas as a terrorist group on 17 October 2023, citing the arrest of a Hamas bombmaker by the Philippine National Police in 2018 and attempts to establish alliances with local extremist groups in 2022 while stressing that the decision was made independently.
Qatar	No	The Qatari government has a designated terrorist list. As of 2014, the list contained no names, according to The Daily Telegraph. In September 2020, Qatar brokered a ceasefire between Israel and Hamas that is reported to include "plans to build a power station operated by Qatar, the provision of $34 million for humanitarian aid, provision of 20,000 COVID-19 testing kits by Qatar to the Health Ministry, and a number of initiatives to reduce unemployment in the Gaza Strip."
Russia	No	Russia does not designate Hamas a terrorist organisation, and held direct talks with Hamas in 2006, after Hamas won the Palestine elections, stating that it did so to press Hamas to reject violence and recognise Israel.
Saudi Arabia	No	Saudi Arabia banned the Muslim Brotherhood in 2014 and branded it a terrorist organization. While Hamas is not specifically listed, a non-official Saudi source stated that the decision also encompasses its branches in other countries, including Hamas. As of January 2020, ties between Saudi Arabia and Hamas remain strained despite attempts at a rapprochement. Wesam Afifa, director general of Al-Aqsa TV is quoted as saying that "Saudi Arabia did not sever ties with Hamas, and even when Riyadh made public its list of terrorists in 2017, Hamas was not added to the list." In 2020, Saudi Arabia arrested 68 Palestinian and Jordanian citizens associated with Hamas in a special terrorism court. In 2022, Saudi Arabia released a number of those detainees in recent months, including senior member Mohammad Al-Khodary, who was set free in October, following statements by Hamas leaders expressing their desire for improved relations with the country. In 2023, during Ramadan, senior members of Hamas, including Ismail Haniyeh, Mousa Marzook, Khalil al-Hayya and Khaled Meshaal arrived in Saudi Arabia to mend Hamas's relationship with Saudi Arabia. They were spotted performing Umrah in Mecca, Saudi Arabia.
Switzerland	Partial	Before the Hamas-led attack on Israel, Switzerland had not designated it as a terrorist organization and had direct contacts with all major stakeholders in the Israeli–Palestinian conflict, including Hamas. After the attack, the Federal Council classified Hamas as a terrorist organization and stated that it would recommend Swiss parliament to pass a new law by the end of February 2024 to ban "Hamas activities" or "support" for the group. The Security Policy Commission of the National Council on 10 October had voted to ban Hamas and declare it terrorist with the Swiss parliament's upper house, the Council of States, following suit. The Federal Council proposed a five-year ban on Hamas which still needs to be ratified by both houses of parliament to take effect.
Syria	No	Syria does not designate Hamas as a terrorist organization. Syria is among other countries that consider Hamas' armed struggle to be legitimate.
Turkey	No	The Turkish government met with Hamas leaders in February 2006, after the organization's victory in the Palestinian elections. In 2010, Prime Minister Recep Tayyip Erdoğan described Hamas as "resistance fighters who are struggling to defend their land".
Ukraine	No	Hamas is not included in the Security Service of Ukraine's list of terrorist organizations as of July 2026. However, draft resolutions calling for its recognition as a terrorist organization have been submitted to the Verkhovna Rada in 2021 and in 2023. President Volodymyr Zelenskyy has also openly condemned the group as terrorists shortly after the October 7 attacks.
United Kingdom	Yes	Hamas in its entirety is proscribed as a terrorist group and banned under the Terrorism Act 2000. "The government now assess that the approach of distinguishing between the various parts of Hamas is artificial. Hamas is a complex but single terrorist organisation."
United Nations	No	The list of United Nations designated terrorist groups does not include Hamas. On December 5, 2018, the UN rejected a US resolution aimed at unilaterally condemning Hamas for Palestinian rocket attacks on Israel and other violence.
United States	Yes	Lists Hamas as a "Foreign Terrorist Organization". The State Department decided to add Hamas to its US State Department list of Foreign Terrorist Organizations in April 1993. As of 2023, it is still listed.

== Lawsuits ==
=== United States ===
The charitable trust Holy Land Foundation for Relief and Development was accused in December 2001 of funding Hamas. The US Justice Department filed 200 charges against the foundation. The case first ended in a mistrial, in which jurors acquitted on some counts and were deadlocked on charges ranging from tax violations to providing material support for terrorists. In a retrial, on November 24, 2008, the five leaders of the Foundation were convicted on 108 counts.

Several US organizations were either shut down or held liable for financing Hamas in early 2001, groups that have origins from the mid-1990s, among them the Holy Land Foundation (HLF), Islamic Association for Palestine (IAP), and Kind Hearts. The US Treasury Department specially designated the HLF in 2001 for terror ties because they claimed that from 1995 to 2001 the HLF transferred "approximately $12.4 million outside of the United States with the intent to contribute funds, goods, and services to Hamas." According to the Treasury Department, Khaled Mashal identified one of HLF's officers, Mohammed El-Mezain as "the Hamas leader for the US". In 2003, IAP was found liable for financially supporting Hamas, and in 2006, Kind Hearts had their assets frozen for supporting Hamas.

In 2004, a federal court in the United States found Hamas liable in a civil lawsuit for the 1996 murders of Yaron and Efrat Ungar near Bet Shemesh, Israel. Hamas was ordered to pay the families of the Ungars $116 million. The Palestinian Authority settled the lawsuit in 2011. The settlement terms were not disclosed. On August 20, 2004, three Palestinians, one a naturalized American citizen, were charged with a "lengthy racketeering conspiracy to provide money for terrorist acts in Israel". The indicted included Mousa Abu Marzook, who had left the US in 1997. On February 1, 2007, two men were acquitted of contravening United States law by supporting Hamas. Both men argued that they helped move money for Palestinian causes aimed at helping the Palestinian people and not to promote terrorism.

In January 2009, a Federal prosecutor accused the Council on American–Islamic Relations (CAIR) of having links to a charity designated as a support network for Hamas. The Justice Department identified CAIR as an "un-indicted co-conspirator" in the Holy Land Foundation case. Later, a federal appeals court removed that label for all parties and instead, named them "joint venturers". CAIR was never charged with any crime, and it complained that the designation had tarnished its reputation.

==== Germany ====
A German federal court ruled in 2004 that Hamas was a unified organization whose humanitarian aid work could not be separated from its "terrorist and political activities". In July 2010, Germany outlawed Frankfurt-based International Humanitarian Aid Organization (IHH e.V.), saying it had used donations to support Hamas-affiliated relief projects in Gaza. German Interior Minister Thomas de Maizière said that while presenting their activities to donors as humanitarian assistance, IHH e.V. had "exploited trusting donors' willingness to help by using money that was given for a good purpose for supporting what is, in the final analysis, a terrorist organization".

== Sources ==
- Brenner, Björn (2017). Gaza Under Hamas: From Islamic Democracy to Islamist Governance. I.B. Tauris. ISBN 978-1786731425.
- "Hamas: The Organizations, Goals and Tactics of a Militant Palestinian Organization". CRS Issue Brief. October 14, 1993. Archived from the original on January 6, 2006.
- "UN General Assembly rejects US resolution to condemn Hamas". Deutsche Welle. December 7, 2018.
- Haspeslagh, Sophie (2016). ""Listing terrorists"; the impact of proscription on third-party efforts to engage armed groups in peace processes- a practitioner's perspective'". In Tellidis, Ioannis; Toros, Harmonie (eds.). Terrorism: Bridging the Gap with Peace and Conflict Studies: Investigating the Crossroad. Routledge. pp. 189–207. ISBN 978-1317665595.
- Hirst, David (November 22, 1999). "Jordan curbs Hamas". The Guardian.
