= Varsha (given name) =

Varsha is a feminine given name. Notable people with the name include:

- Varsha Adalja, Indian novelist, playwright, and negotiator
- Varsha Ashwathi, Indian actress
- Varsha Bharath, director of the 2025 Indian Tamil-language coming-of-age film Bad Girl
- Varsha Bhosle (1956–2012), Indian singer, journalist, and writer
- Varsha Bollamma, Indian actress
- Varsha Choudhary (born 1992), Indian cricketer
- Varsha Deshpande (fl. 1990–present), Indian activist
- Varsha Dixit, Indian author
- Varsha Gaikwad, Indian parliamentarian
- Varsha Gautham, Indian sailor
- Varsha Jain, British physician
- Varsha Nair, Ugandan painter
- Varsha Priyadarshini, Indian actress and politician
- Varsha Raffel (born 1975), Indian One Day International cricketer
- Varsha Ragoobarsing, Mauritian contestant for Miss Universe 2018
- Varsha Rani, Indian politician
- Varsha Soni, Indian field hockey player
- Varsha Usgaonkar, Indian actress, singer, and stage performer
- Varsha Varman (born 1994), Indian sport shooter
