= Dowkal Pahan =

Dowkal Pahan دوكل پهن
- Village
- Location within Iran
- Coordinates: 27°18′14″N 55°18′06″E
- Country: Iran
- Province: Hormozgan
- County: Khamir
- Bakhsh: Central
- Rural District: Kohurestan

Population (2006)
  - Total: 99
- Time zone: UTC+3:30 (IRST)
  - Summer (DST): UTC+4:30 (IRDT)

Dowkal Pahan (Persian: دوكل پهن; also known as Berkeh-ye Now (Persian: بركه نو), Berkeh-ye Nūḩ, and Birkeh Nūh) is a village in Kohurestan Rural District, in the Central District of Khamir County, Hormozgan Province, Iran. At the 2006 census, its population was 99, in 21 families.
