= Barkah, Afghanistan =

Barkah
- Location in Afghanistan
- Coordinates: 36°13′24″N 69°09′24″E
- Country: Afghanistan
- Province: Baghlan Province
- Time zone: + 4.30

Barkah is a village in Baghlan Province in northeastern Afghanistan.

== See also ==
- Baghlan Province
