= Al Baraka =

Al Baraka, Al-Baraka, or Albaraka may refer to:

- Al Baraka Palace
- Al-Barakah (Islamic State administrative district)
- Dallah Al-Baraka, private multinational corporation based in Jeddah, Saudi Arabia

- Al Baraka Group, banking group and subsidiary of Dallah Al-Baraka

- Al Baraka Bank Pakistan, subsidiary of Al Baraka Group
- Albaraka Türk

== See also ==
- Baraka (disambiguation)
- Al-Sa'id Baraka
