= Berkeh-ye Soltan =

Berkeh-ye Soltan بركه سلطان
- Village
- Location within Iran
- Coordinates: 27°14′42″N 55°30′17″E
- Country: Iran
- Province: Hormozgan
- County: Khamir
- Bakhsh: Central
- Rural District: Kohurestan

Population (2006)
  - Total: 291
- Time zone: UTC+3:30 (IRST)
  - Summer (DST): UTC+4:30 (IRDT)

Berkeh-ye Soltan (Persian: بركه سلطان, also romanized as Berkeh-ye Solṭān and Berkehsolṭān) is a village in Kohurestan Rural District, in the Central District of Khamir County, Hormozgan Province, Iran. At the 2006 census, its population was 291, in 65 families.
