= Berkeh-ye Mah Banu =

Berkeh-ye Mah Banu بركه ماه بانو
- Village
- Location within Iran
- Coordinates: 27°23′10″N 53°05′55″E
- Country: Iran
- Province: Fars
- County: Lamerd
- Bakhsh: Central
- Rural District: Howmeh

Population (2006)
  - Total: 42
- Time zone: UTC+3:30 (IRST)
  - Summer (DST): UTC+4:30 (IRDT)

Berkeh-ye Mah Banu (Persian: بركه ماه بانو, also Romanized as Berkeh-ye Māh Bānū) is a village in Howmeh Rural District, in the Central District of Lamerd County, Fars province, Iran. At the 2006 census, its population was 42, in 8 families.
