= Berkeh-ye Soflin =

Coordinates: 27.1480°N 54.8344°E

Berkeh-ye Soflin بركه سفلين
- Village
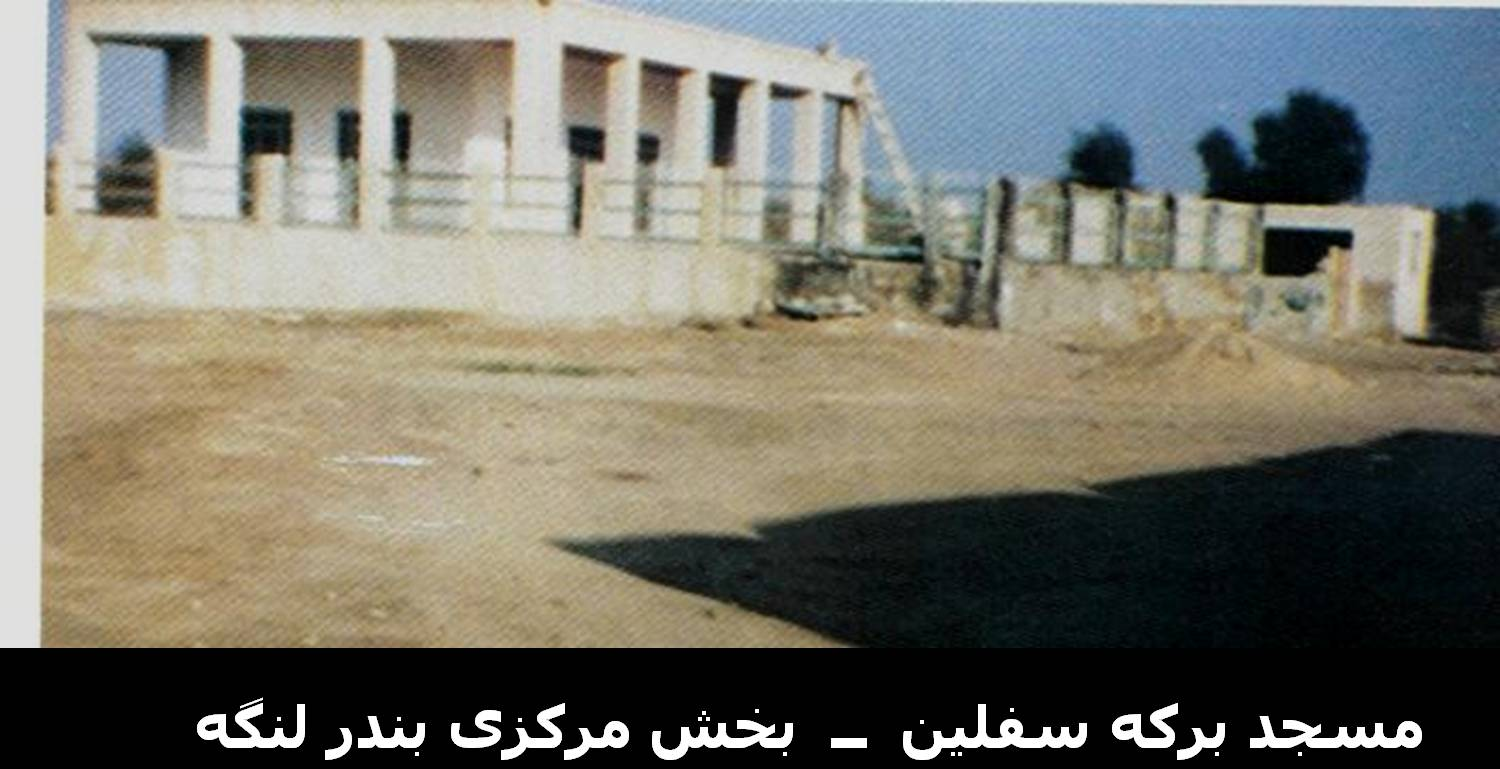
- Berkeh-ye Soflin mosque
- Interactive map of Berkeh-ye Soflin
- Country: Iran
- Province: Hormozgan
- County: Bandar Lengeh
- Bakhsh: Central
- Rural District: Howmeh

Population (2006)
  - Total: 429
- Time zone: UTC+3:30 (IRST)
  - Summer (DST): UTC+4:30 (IRDT)

Berkeh-ye Soflin (Persian: بركه سفلين, also Romanized as Berkeh-ye Soflīn) is a village in Howmeh Rural District, in the Central District of Bandar Lengeh County, Hormozgan Province, Iran. At the 2006 census, its population was 429, in 93 families.
