= Léonard Baraka =

Malagasy footballer

Personal information
- Date of birth: 24 February 1985 (age 41)
- Height: 1.80 m (5 ft 11 in)
- Position: Defender

Senior career*
Years	Team	Apps	(Gls)
2003–2006	Ecoredipharm		
2007–2009	AS Adema		
2010–2015	AS Fortior		

International career
2006–2007	Madagascar	2	(0)
- * Club domestic league appearances and goals

Léonard Baraka (born 24 February 1985) is a Malagasy former footballer who played as a defender.
