= Wissam Baraka =

Moroccan footballer

Personal information
- Full name: Wissam Baraka
- Date of birth: June 13, 1985 (age 41)
- Place of birth: Casablanca, Morocco
- Height: 1.80 m (5 ft 11 in)
- Position: Forward

Team information
- Current team: Nahdat Berkane

Youth career
- ?–2004: Rachad Bernoussi

Senior career*
Years	Team	Apps	(Gls)
2004–2007	Rachad Bernoussi		
2007–2010	Kawkab Marrakech	28	(4)
2010–2012	Olympique Khouribga	5	(0)
2012–2013	Moghreb Tétouan	19	(5)
2013–	Nahdat Berkane		
- * Club domestic league appearances and goals as of 03:33, 3 June 2013 (UTC) ‡ National team caps and goals as of October 17, 2008

Wissam Baraka (born 13 June 1985) is a Moroccan footballer. He usually plays as a forward for Nahdat Berkane.

== See also ==
- Football in Morocco
- List of football clubs in Morocco
