= Barsha =

Barsha may refer to:

== People ==
=== Surname ===
- Afiea Nusrat Barsha (born 1989), Bangladeshi actress
- John Barsha (1898–1976), Russian-born American player of American football
- Leon Barsha (1905–1964), American film producer, editor and director

=== Given name ===
- Barsha Rani Bishaya (born 1982), Indian actress
- Barsha Priyadarshini (born 1984), Indian film actress
- Barsha Lekhi (born 1994), Nepalese beauty queen

== Other ==
- Al Barsha, communities in Dubai
- Barcha, sometimes known as Barsha, a type of lance
- Barsha Utsab, Monsoon salutation festival
- Dubai National School, Al Barsha, school located in Barsha, Dubai
- Deir El Bersha, village in Middle Egypt
