= Alton Gansky =

American novelist

- Occupation: Novelist
- Writing career
- Genre: Christian fiction
- Website: www.altongansky.com

Alton L Gansky is an American novelist in the Christian fiction genre. He has written six non-fiction books and 23 novels, three of which were co-authored with former Army Ranger Jeff Struecker. In 2012 Gansky and Struecker's Fallen Angel was honored as the American Christian Fiction Writers' "top thriller" of that year.

== Bibliography ==
=== Fiction ===
Ridgeline Mystery series

1. Marked for Mercy (1998)
2. A Small Dose of Murder (1999)

J.D. Stanton series

1. A Ship Possessed (1999)
2. Vanished (2000)
3. Out of Time (2003)

Perry Sachs series

1. A Treasure Deep (2003)
2. Beneath the Ice (2004)
3. Submerged (2005)

Madison Glenn series

1. The Incumbent (2004)
2. Before Another Dies (2005)
3. Director's Cut (2005)

Other

- By My Hands (1996)
- Through My Eyes (1997)
- Tarnished Image (1998)
- Terminal Justice (1998)
- Distant Memory (2000)
- Prodigy, the (2001)
- Dark Moon (2002)
- Zero-G (2007)
- Finder's Fee (2007)
- Crime Scene Jerusalem (2007)
- Angel (2007)
- The Bell Messenger (2008, with Robert Cornuke)
- Enoch (2008)

With Major Jeff Struecker

- Certain Jeopardy (2009)
- Blaze of Glory (2010)
- Fallen Angel (2011)

=== Non-fiction ===
- Uncovering the Bible's Greatest Mysteries
- Uncovering God's Mysterious Ways
- The Secrets God Kept
- In His Words
- What Really Matters Most
- 40 Days
- The Solomon Secret (with Bruce Fleet)
- "The Ultimate Guide To Jesus" (Copyright 2008 by GRQ, Inc.)
