= Bob Cornuke =

American writer and archaeologist

Robert Cornuke is an American writer and president of the Bible Archaeology Search and Exploration Institute (BASE), which is operated from his home in Colorado Springs, Colorado. He describes himself as a Biblical archaeologist, but has no degree or training in archaeology.

== Background and explorations ==
He holds a Master of Arts in Biblical Studies and a Ph.D. in Bible and Theology, both from Louisiana Baptist University. He is the author of six books about his explorations. Cornuke uses the Bible as a literal guide for his explorations, and prioritizes it over secular and historical sources.

James K. Hoffmeier describes him as "a former Los Angeles SWAT policeman and more recently a real estate agent" in his 2005 book Ancient Israel in Sinai: The Evidence for the Authenticity of the Wilderness Tradition.

Cornuke claims to have discovered the anchors from the Apostle Paul’s shipwreck in Marsaskala, as described in the Bible's Book of Acts, chapter 27 — by searching the sea floor off the coast of Malta.

He also made an expedition to Takht-i-Suleiman in Iran in July 2005 and June 2006, where he asserts that he found a rock formation approximately 400 ft long at 13,120 ft (4,000 m) elevation. Cornuke's search appeared on Fox News, CNN, and Good Morning America as well as others.

=== Mount Sinai ===
Cornuke's book, In Search of the Mountain of God, claimed to match of the biblical Mount Sinai to Jabal al-Lawz in Saudi Arabia. A similar claim was made earlier, in 1984, by Ron Wyatt.

=== Island of Malta ===
In 2002 Cornuke claimed to have found anchors from the biblical shipwreck of the Apostle Paul in waters near Malta. This claim has been disputed. In 2003 Christianity Today reported that the then U.S. ambassador Kathryn Proffitt sued Cornuke to stop the sale of his book after she arranged for the "Maltese government to pardon the fisherman". (Cornuke would claim these "were from the apostle's ship.") Proffitt contended that as part of the pardon arrangement and several other issues, Cornuke agreed to remain silent about the pardon and "to allow Proffitt and the Maltese government to edit the book. He would also be required to encourage tourists to visit ancient temples." According to some he did not keep his part of the agreement.

A federal judge denied the request to hold up publication of the book since it was already released at the time. Even still, "what the Maltese government is apparently upset about, however, isn't that Cornuke's book was published without its permission, but that it claims that the shipwreck never happened in the traditional site on the northeastern tip of the island, now known as St. Paul's Bay."

=== Noah's Ark ===
Supporters of Cornuke claimed in June 2006 that Cornuke may have discovered Noah's Ark in a pile of dark-colored rocks on the Iranian Takht-e Suleiman ("Throne of Solomon") or Mount Suleiman in the Alborz (Elborz) Mountains. Cornuke relies heavily on the claims of Ed Davis, and there are problems with Davis being in Iran in 1943 let alone at this site where he claimed to see Noah's Ark. Even creationist geologists doubt whether the rocks viewed by Cornuke are petrified and are urging caution. The research team included Arch Bonnema, film producer of The Genius Club and other well-known Christian businessmen. John Morris, of the Institute of Creation Research, does not believe the rocks viewed by Cornuke are petrified or Noah's Ark. Even Cornuke himself isn't completely convinced that what he observed was Noah's Ark or even if it was petrified wood. Associates for Biblical Research also produced a 7,800-word paper about problems with the Cornuke site. National Geographic critiqued the rocks at the site.

== Books ==
- In Search of the Mountain of God: The Discovery of the Real Mt. Sinai, Part 1, Broadman & Holman Publishers, 2000. ISBN 0-8054-2052-5 (Co-written with David Halbrook)
- In Search of the Lost Mountains of Noah: The Discovery of the Real Mt. Ararat, Part 2, Broadman & Holman Publishers, 2001. ISBN 0-8054-2054-1 (Co-written with David Halbrook)
- In Search of the Lost Ark of the Covenant, Part 3, Broadman & Holman Publishers, 2002. ISBN 0-8054-2053-3 (Co-written with David Halbrook)
- The Lost Shipwreck of St. Paul, Global Publishing Services, 2003. ISBN 0-9714100-3-8
- Ark Fever:Legend Chaser, Tyndale House Publishers, 2005. ISBN 1-4143-0296-7
- Relic Quest: Legend Chaser, Tyndale House Publishers, 2005. ISBN 1-4143-0297-5
- The Bell Messenger: A Novel, (with Alton Gansky), Howard Books, 2008. ISBN 978-1-4165-4981-9
- Temple — Amazing New Discoveries That Change Everything About The Location Of Solomon's Temple, LifeBridge Books, 2014. ISBN 978-1-939779-09-0
