= Barakeh, Hama =

Barakeh, Hama البركة
- Village
- Location in Syria
- Coordinates: 35.670°N 36.273°E
- Country: Syria
- Governorate: Hama
- District: Al-Suqaylabiyah District
- Subdistrict: Al-Ziyarah Nahiyah

Population (2004)
  - Total: 295
- Time zone: UTC+3 (AST)
- City Qrya Pcode: C3163

Barakeh (Arabic: البركة), also spelt Barakah and Birkah, is a Syrian village in Al-Ziyarah Nahiyah in Al-Suqaylabiyah District, Hama. It lies on the western edge of Al-Ghab plain. According to the Syria Central Bureau of Statistics (CBS), Barakeh had a population of 295 in the 2004 census.
