= Midian =

Place mentioned in the Hebrew Bible and Quran

Midian Hebrew: מִדְיָן, romanized: Mīḏyān Arabic: مَدْيَن, romanized: Madyan Ancient Greek: Μαδιάμ, romanized: Madiam
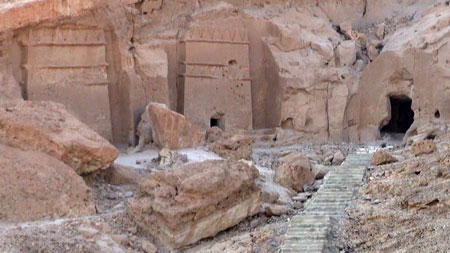
- Above: Shuaib Caves in Al-Bada'a, region of Tabuk in northwestern Saudi Arabia; Below: Map

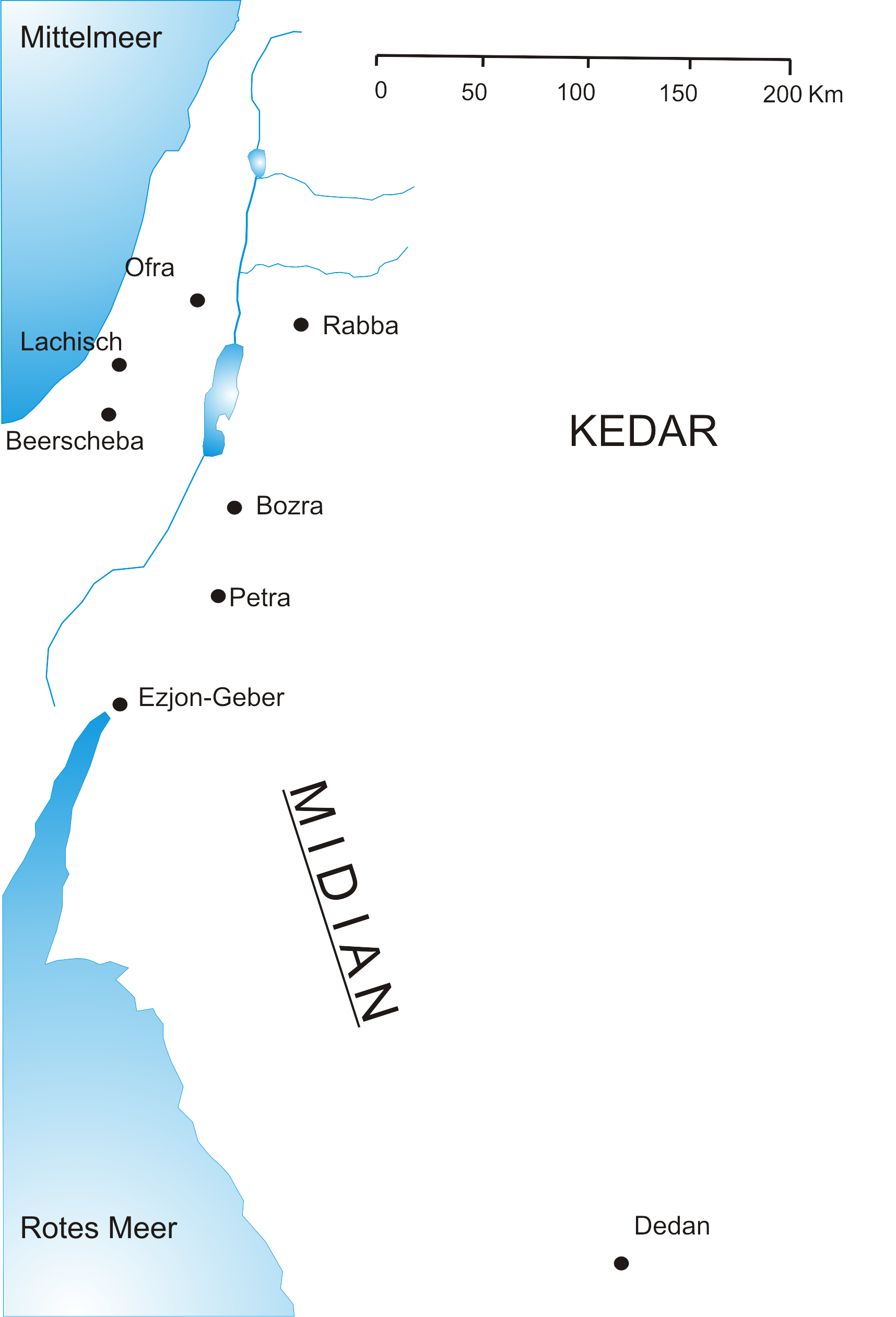
- Interactive map of Midian

Midian (/ˈmɪdiən/; Hebrew: מִדְיָן, romanized: Mīḏyān; Arabic: مَدْيَن, romanized: Madyan; Ancient Greek: Μαδιάμ, romanized: Madiám; (Note: Also Μαδιανίτης for "Midianite".) Taymanitic: 𐪃𐪕𐪚𐪌, romanized: mdyn) was a geographical region in the Tabuk Province of modern-day Saudi Arabia, mentioned in the Hebrew Bible and Quran. William G. Dever states that biblical Midian was in the "northwest Arabian Peninsula, on the east shore of the Gulf of Aqaba on the Red Sea", an area which contained at least 14 inhabited sites during the Late Bronze and early Iron Ages. The Hebrew Bible refers to Midian, a son of Abraham and his wife Keturah, and lists his immediate descendants, the "Midianites".

Some scholars believe that Midian originally referred, not to a geographical location, but instead, to a tribal confederation. This was first suggested in 1909 by Paul Haupt, who termed Midian a "cultic collective" (German: Kultgenossenschaft) or an amphictyony, and has since been widely adopted.

Traditionally, knowledge about Midian and the Midianites' existence was based solely upon Biblical and classical sources, but in 2010 a reference to Midian was identified in a Taymanitic inscription dated to before the 9th century BC.

== Religion ==
=== Pantheon ===
In ancient times, Midianite religion was polytheistic. The exact nature of ancient Midianite religion has not been established. Their religious and political links with the Moabites could imply that they shared some of their gods, including Baal-peor and Ashteroth. If a connection between the Midianites and the Shasu is correct, this would imply that by the fourteenth century BC, Yahweh was also one of the gods worshiped by the Midianites.

=== Christian period ===
In late antiquity, the inhabitants of Midian may have adopted Christianity. Umayyad-era poetry, in the early eighth-century, attests to the presence of monks and monasteries at Midian (as well as nearby sites, such as Wadi al-Qura), especially in the verses of the poet Kuthayyir who speaks of the "monks of Madyan".

== Archaeology ==
=== Metallurgy ===
The area of Timna valley contains large deposits of copper that had been mined from the prehistoric times onward. Copper was mined here by the Egyptians during the reign of Pharaoh Seti I at the end of the 14th century BCE. Large amounts of Midianite ceramic ware has been discovered at these mining sites.

The Midianites transformed the Hathor mining temple into a desert tent-shrine. In addition to the discovery of post-holes, large quantities of red and yellow decayed cloth with beads woven into it, along with numerous copper rings/wire used to suspend the curtains, were found all along two walls of the shrine.

Beno Rothenberg, the excavator of the site, suggested that the Midianites were making offerings to Hathor, especially since a large number of Midianite votive vessels (25%) were discovered in the shrine. However, whether Hathor or some other deity was the object of devotion during this period is difficult to ascertain.

A small bronze snake with a gilded head was also discovered in the naos of the Timna mining shrine, along with a hoard of metal objects that included a small bronze figurine of a bearded male god, which according to Rothenberg was Midianite in origin. Michael Homan observes that the Midianite tent-shrine at Timna provides one of the closest parallels to the biblical Tabernacle.

=== Pottery ===
Midianite pottery, also called Qurayyah Painted Ware (QPW), is found at numerous sites stretching from the southern Levant to NW Saudi Arabia, the Hejaz; Qurayyah in NW Saudi Arabia is thought to be its original location of manufacture. The pottery is bichrome / polychrome style and it dates as early as the 13th century BC; its many geometric, human, and animal motifs are painted in browns and dark reds on a pinkish-tan slip. "Midianite" pottery is found in its largest quantities at metallurgical sites in the southern Levant, especially Timna. Because of the Mycenaean motifs on Midianite pottery, some scholars including George Mendenhall, Peter Parr, and Beno Rothenberg have suggested that the Midianites were originally Sea Peoples who migrated from the Aegean region and imposed themselves on a pre-existing Semitic stratum. The question of the origin of the Midianites still remains open.

=== Temples ===
An Egyptian temple of Hathor at Timna (Site 200) was first discovered during Beno Rothenberg's excavations.

"Rothenberg’s excavation of Site 200 revealed a number of Egyptian hieroglyphic inscriptions including those of: Seti I, Ramesses II, Merneptah, Seti II, and Queen Twosret of the Nineteenth Dynasty, as well as Ramesses III, Ramesses IV, and Ramesses V of the Twentieth Dynasty (pp. 163–166)."

The site also continued in use during the Midianite occupation in the area, which is usually dated to terminal Late Bronze Age-Early Iron Age.

== In scriptures ==
=== In the Bible ===
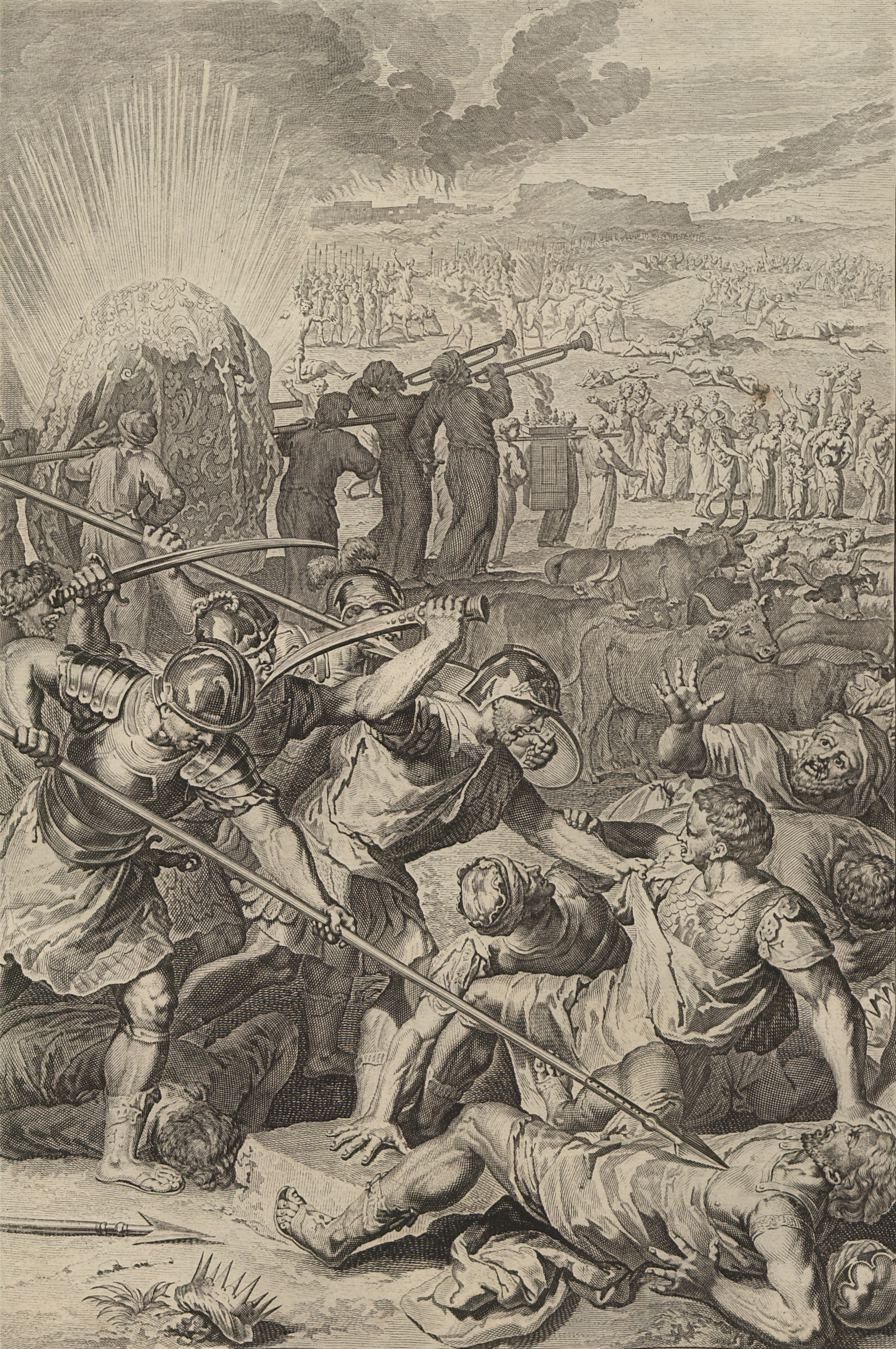
Five kings of Midian slain by Israel (illustration from the 1728 Figures de la Bible)

Midian was the son of Abraham and Keturah. Abraham's great-grandson Joseph, after being thrown into a pit near Dothan by his brothers, was sold to either Midianite or Ishmaelite traders en route to Egypt: both terms are used in Genesis 37:25-28.

Moses spent 40 years in self-imposed exile in Midian after killing an Egyptian. There, he married Zipporah, the daughter of Midianite priest Jethro (also known as Reuel). Jethro advised Moses on establishing a system of delegated legal decision-making. Moses asked Hobab, the son of Reuel, to accompany the Israelites travelling towards the Promised Land because of his local knowledge, but Hobab preferred to return to his homeland. A number of scholars have proposed that the biblical description of devouring fire on Mount Sinai refers to an erupting volcano in the land of biblical Midian identified as Hala-'l Badr in northwestern Saudi Arabia.

During the Baal-Peor episode, when Moabite women seduced Israelite men, Zimri, the son of a Simeonite chief, got involved with a Midianite woman called Cozbi. The couple were speared by Phinehas. War against Midian followed. Numbers 31 reports that all but the virgin females were slain and their cities burned to the ground. Some commentators, for example the Pulpit Commentary and Gill's Exposition of the Bible, note that God's command focused on attacking the Midianites and not the Moabites, and similarly Moses in Deuteronomy directed that the Israelites should not harass the Moabites.

During the time of the Judges, Israel was oppressed by Midian for seven years, until Gideon defeated Midian's armies. Isaiah speaks of camels from Midian and Ephah coming to "cover your land", along with the gold and frankincense from Sheba. This passage, taken by the Gospel of Matthew as a foreshadowing of the Magi's gifts to the infant Jesus, has been incorporated into the Christmas liturgy.

=== In the Quran ===
The people of Midian are mentioned extensively in the Quran. The word 'Madyan' appears 10 times. The people are also called ʾaṣḥabu l-ʾaykah (Arabic: أَصْحَابُ ٱلْأَيْكَة, lit. 'Companions of the Wood'). The lands of Midian are mentioned in sura Al-Qasas (The Stories), verses 20–28, as the place where Musa (Moses) escaped upon learning of the chiefs conspiring to kill him.

Surah 9 (Al-Tawbah), verse 70 says "Has not the story reached them of those before them? – The people of Nūḥ (Noah), ʿĀd and Thamud, the people of Ibrahim (Abraham), the dwellers [literally, comrades] of Madyan (Midian) and the cities overthrown [i.e. the people to whom Lūṭ (Lot) preached], to them came their Messengers with clear proofs. So it was not Allah who wronged them, but they used to wrong themselves."

In Surah 7 (Al-ʾAʿrāf), Madyan is mentioned as one of several peoples who were warned by prophets to repent lest judgment fall on them. The story of Madyan is the last, coming after that of Lot preaching to his people (referring to the destruction of the Cities of the Plain). Madyan was warned by the prophet Shuʿaib to repent of practicing polytheism, using false weights and measures and lying in wait along the road. But they rejected Shuʿaib, and consequently were destroyed by a tremor (rajfa, v. 91). Abdullah Yusuf Ali in his commentary (1934) writes, "The fate of the Madyan people is described in the same terms as that of the Thamūd in verse 78 above. An earthquake seized them by night, and they were buried in their own homes, no longer to vex Allah's earth. But a supplementary detail is mentioned in [Quran] 26:189, 'the punishment of a day of overshadowing gloom', which may be understood to mean a shower of ashes and cinders accompanying a volcanic eruption. Thus a day of terror drove them into their homes, and the earthquake finished them." Excavations at the oasis of Al-Bad', identified as the city of Midian mentioned in classical and Islamic sources, have uncovered evidence of an occupation spanning from the 4th millennium BC.

== Midian Mountains ==
Midian Mountains
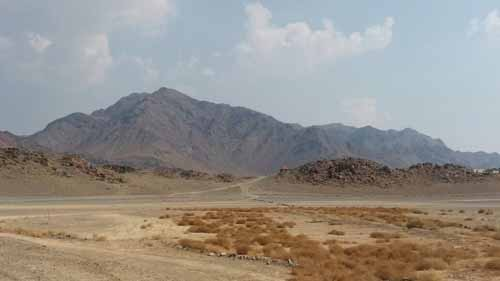
- Jabal Ḥubaysh (Arabic: جَبَل حُبَيْش)

Naming
- Native name: جِبَال مَدْيَن (Arabic)

Geography
- Location within Saudi Arabia Location within Middle East Location within Asia
- Countries: Saudi Arabia; Jordan
- Region(s): Tabuk (KSA) 'Aqabah (Jordan); Middle East
- Range coordinates: 28.3°N 35.6°E

The Midian Mountains (Arabic: جِبَال مَدْيَن, romanized: Jibāl Madyan) are a mountain range in northwestern Saudi Arabia. They are considered to be either contiguous with the Hijaz Mountains to the south, or a part of them. The Hijaz are treated as part of the Sarawat range, sensu lato.

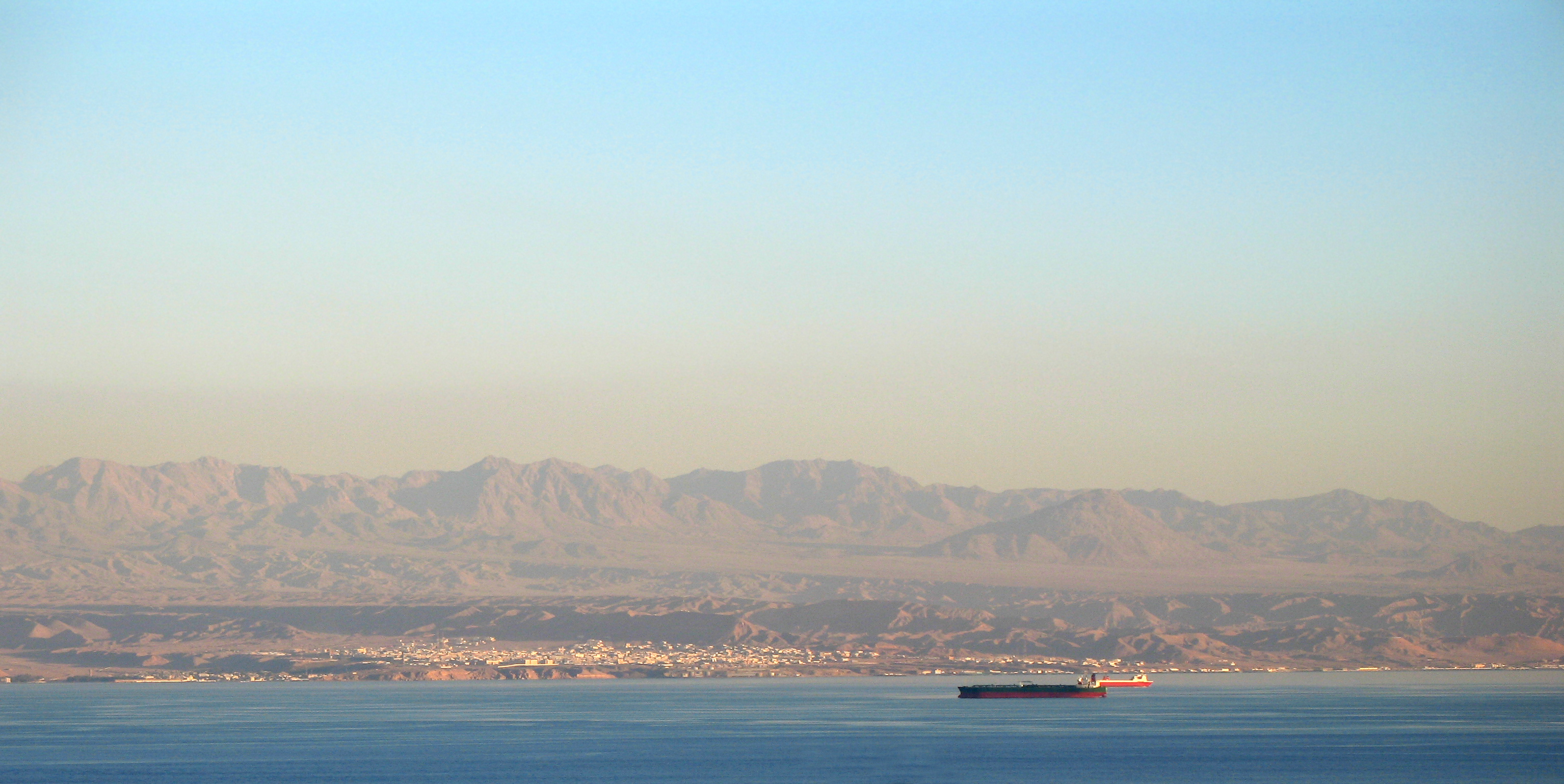
Haql on the coast of the Gulf of Aqaba between the Syrian region and Arabian and Sinai Peninsulas, with the mountains in the background

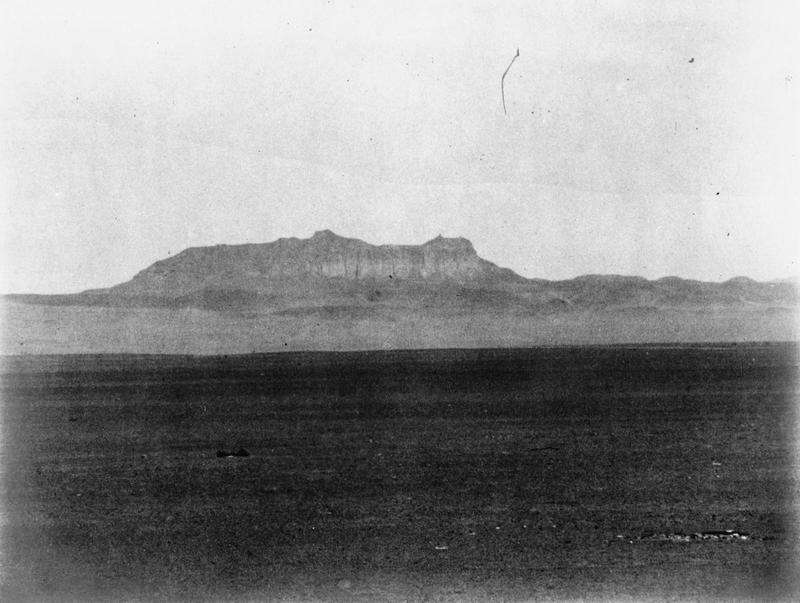
1908 image of a mountain associated with Muhammad and Lawrence of Arabia, 40 miles (64 km) from Tabuk

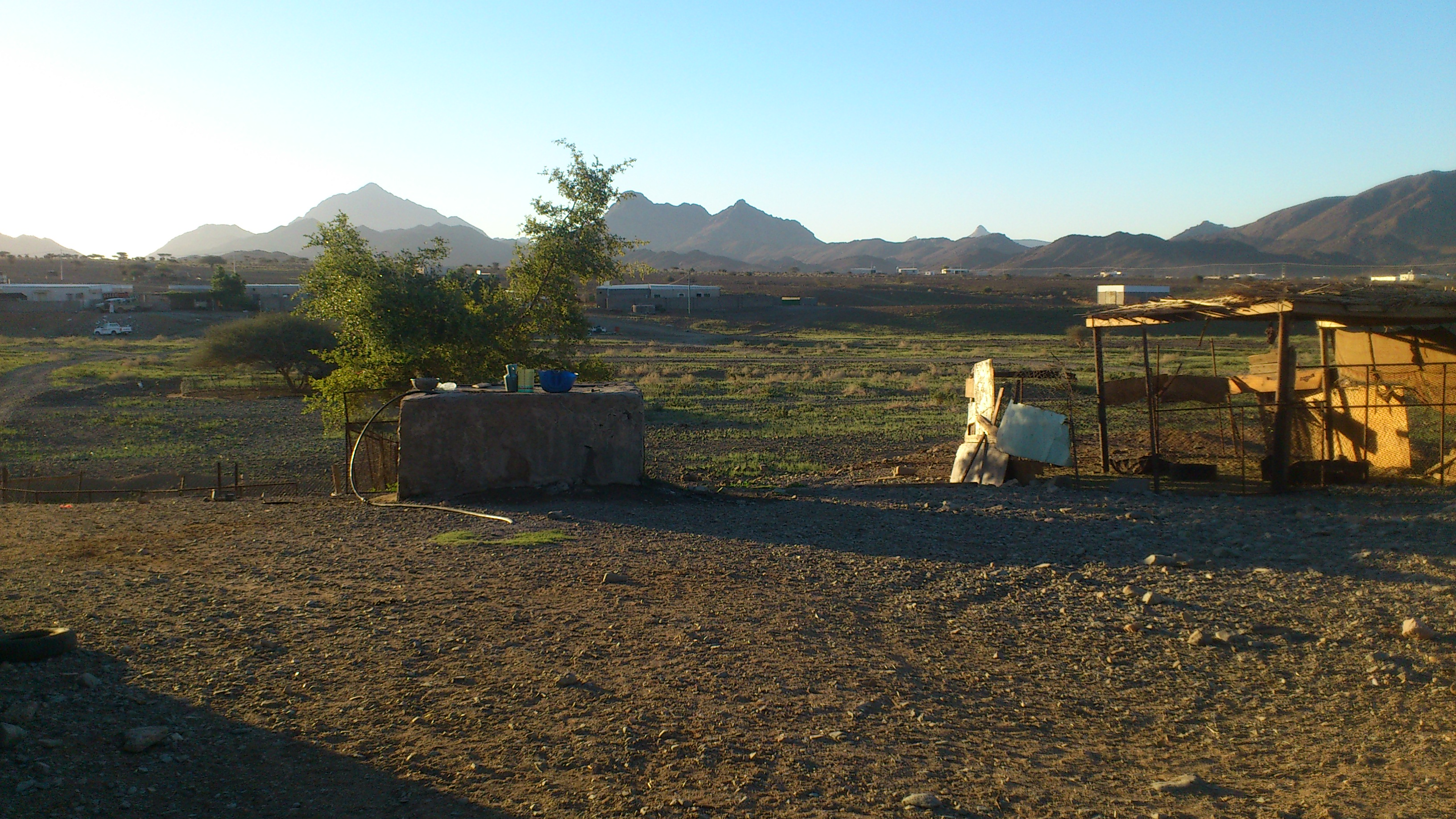

== See also ==
- ʿĀd
- Balak
- Al-Bad'
- Ishmaelites
- History of ancient Israel and Judah
- The Bible and history
- Midian war
- Abarim, Jordanian mountains to the north
- Biblical Mount Sinai
