= Christopher C. Augur =

American military officer (1821–1898)

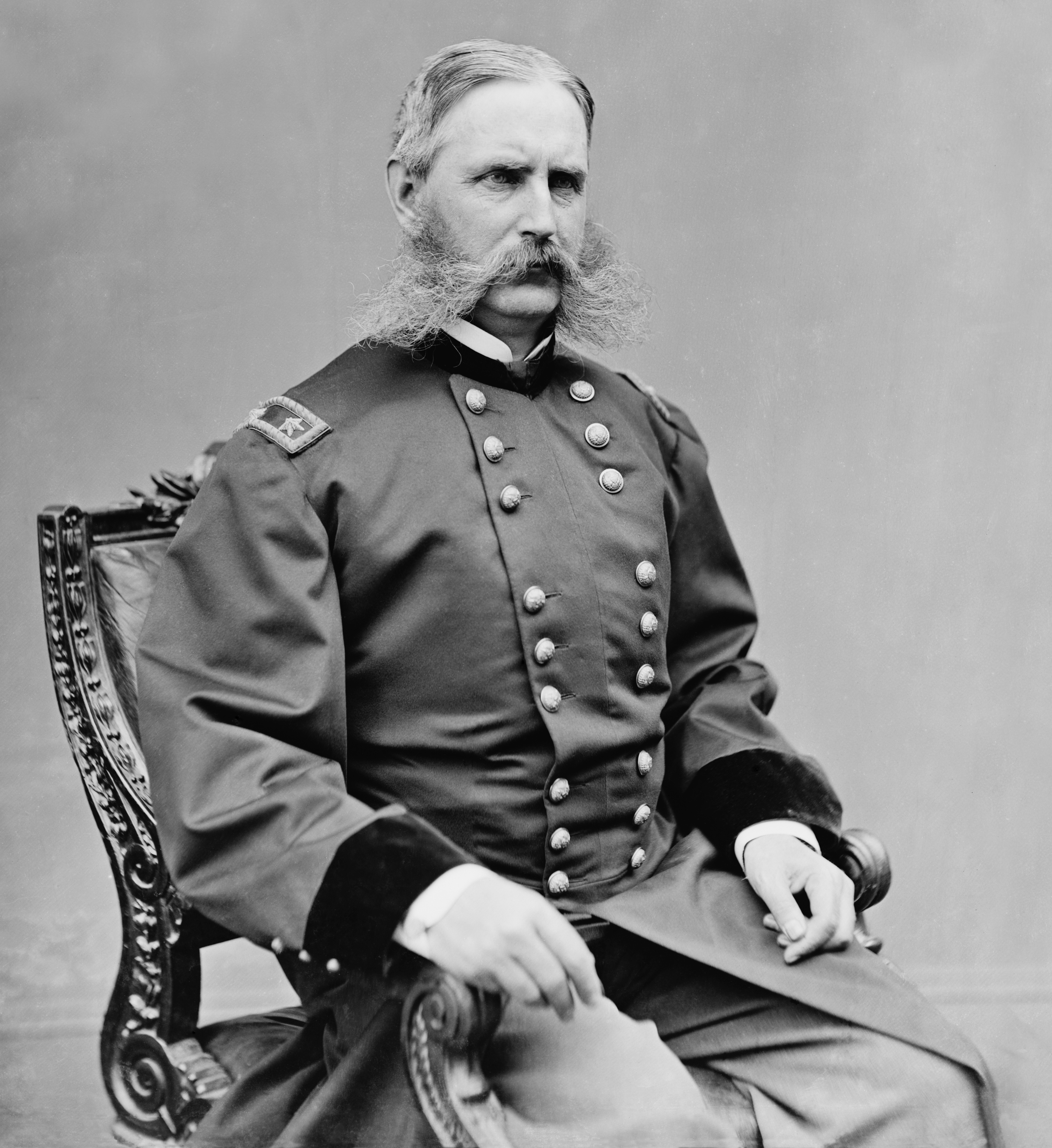
- Christopher C. Augur
- Born: July 10, 1821; Kendall, New York, US
- Died: January 16, 1898 (aged 76); Georgetown, Washington, D.C., US
- Burial place: Arlington National Cemetery
- Military career
- Allegiance: United States; Union
- Branch: United States Army; Union Army
- Service years: 1843–1885
- Rank: Major General
- Units: 4th U.S. Infantry; 13th U.S. Infantry
- Commands: Eastern Iron Brigade; 2nd Division, II Corps; XXII Corps; Department of Washington; Department of the Missouri; 12th U.S. Infantry
- Conflicts: Yakima War; Rogue River Wars; Mexican–American War; American Civil War

Christopher Columbus Augur (July 10, 1821 – January 16, 1898) was an American military officer, most noted for his role in the American Civil War. Although less well known than many other army contemporaries, he was considered an able battlefield commander.

== Early life ==
Augur was born in Kendall, New York. He moved with his family to Michigan and entered West Point in 1839. Augur graduated in 1843 in the same class as General of the Army Ulysses S. Grant. Following his graduation, Augur served as aide-de-camp to Generals Hopping and Cushing during the Mexican–American War, and during the 1850s took an active part in the campaigns of the western frontier against the Yakima and Rogue River tribes of Washington and, in 1856, against the Oregon Indians. In Oregon, he was responsible for building Fort Hoskins in Kings Valley.

== Civil War ==
Augur was promoted to the rank of Major in the 13th Infantry on May 14, 1861. The American Civil War was just over four months old when Augur was made Commandant of Cadets at West Point on August 26, 1861, replacing John F. Reynolds who, newly promoted to Brigadier General, had left that position on June 25, 1861, to perform other military duties. Augur served as Commandant of Cadets and West Point's infantry tactics instructor until December 5, 1861.

In November 1861, Augur was appointed Brigadier General of volunteers and assigned a brigade command in Brigadier General Irvin McDowell's Corps. In July 1862, Augur was transferred to command a division under Major General Nathaniel Banks. Augur was severely wounded at the Battle of Cedar Mountain in August 1862. He was appointed Major General of volunteers by President Abraham Lincoln on November 14, 1862, with the date of August 9, 1862, as his effective date of rank. President Lincoln had to submit the nomination three times before the U.S. Senate finally confirmed the appointment on March 10, 1863.

On December 14, 1862, Major General Nathaniel P. Banks relieved Major General Benjamin F. Butler of command of the Army of the Gulf, the forces of which became the new XIX Army Corps. Major General Augur was given command of its 1st Division. Major General Augur was in command at Baton Rouge, Louisiana, on May 2, 1863, where he unexpectedly received Colonel Benjamin H. Grierson leading his tattered and exhausted volunteer Brigade of Union cavalrymen from their sixteen-day, 600 mile raid (Grierson's Raid) behind Confederate lines in Tennessee, Mississippi and Louisiana. Augur insisted that Grierson's command be honored with a parade, and subsequently Grierson and his troopers were regaled with flying banners and martial music as they entered the city marching in a column that extended for two miles through the streets of Baton Rouge.

During the Siege of Port Hudson, which lasted from April 27 to July 9, 1863, Augur commanded the First Division in the XIX Corps of Major General Bank's Army of the Gulf. Banks had replaced Butler as the Army's commander in December 1862. Augur's First Division acted as the left wing of Bank's army throughout the siege. Augur was brevetted first to Brigadier General in the United States Army on March 13, 1865, for his meritorious service during the Post Hudson Campaign and then, on the same date, brevetted to Major General for his service during the war.

After the fall of Port Hudson, Augur was assigned command of the XXII Corps and the Department of Washington which he held from October 13, 1863, to August 13, 1866.

Augur was one of the Army officers who were present at the Petersen House where the mortally wounded President Abraham Lincoln was taken after he was shot by John Wilkes Booth. At Secretary of War Edwin Stanton's request, Augur went into the street and called out for a competent phonographer who knew shorthand well enough to take verbatim notes for Stanton as he interviewed witnesses to that night's tragic event. Corporal James R. Tanner answered Augur's call and volunteered to transcribe the witness accounts for Secretary Stanton. Augur escorted Corporal Tanner into the Petersen House where he introduced Tanner to Secretary Stanton and Chief Justice David K. Cartter, who was also present for the depositions. Augur then outlined to Tanner what his duties would be for the rest of the night.

Throughout that fateful night, and in the following days, Augur was instrumental in mobilizing troops in his command to pursue and eventually capture Booth and his co-conspirators, including detailing the detachment of the 16th Regiment New York Volunteer Cavalry under the command of Lt. Edward P. Doherty to follow a lead given to Stanton by a Union spy which eventually led to Lt. Doherty and his detachment tracking down and cornering President Lincoln's assassin, Booth, and his associate, David Herold, in a tobacco barn near Port Royal, Virginia.

At about 9:30 a.m. on the morning of April 15, 1865, about ninety minutes after Mr. Lincoln had succumbed to the assassin's bullet, Augur served as one of the officers who walked as escorts for the president's body from the Petersen House, where the president died, to the White House. On Wednesday, April 19, 1865, Augur served as the officer in charge of the military procession that escorted the president's body from the White House to the Capitol where it lie in state.

== Postbellum career ==
Following the war, Augur went on to command several military departments: the Department of the Platte from January 15, 1867, to November 13, 1871; the Department of Texas from November 1871, to March 1875; the Department of the Gulf from 1875 to July 1, 1878; the Department of the South from July 1, 1878, to December 26, 1880; and then he returned to the Department of Texas where he commanded for approximately another three years between January 2, 1881, and October 31, 1883. He headed up the Military Division of the Missouri from 1883–85. He also played a major role in negotiating the Treaty of Medicine Lodge in 1867 and the Treaty of Fort Laramie in 1868. A fort in the Wyoming Territory was briefly named Fort Augur in his honor. In 1885, he retired from the Army with the rank of Brigadier General.

He was a member of the Aztec Club of 1847, the Military Order of the Loyal Legion of the United States and the Military Order of Foreign Wars.

Augur died in Georgetown, Washington, D.C., on January 16, 1898, and is buried in Arlington National Cemetery.

== See also ==
- List of American Civil War generals (Union)
