= Manhunt (miniseries) =

American historical conspiracy thriller miniseries

- Promotional poster
- Genre: Conspiracy thriller; Historical drama
- Created by: Monica Beletsky
- Based on: Manhunt: The 12-Day Chase for Lincoln's Killer by James L. Swanson
- Showrunner: Monica Beletsky
- Directed by: Carl Franklin; John Dahl; Eva Sørhaug
- Starring: Tobias Menzies; Anthony Boyle; Lovie Simone; Will Harrison; Brandon Flynn; Damian O'Hare; Glenn Morshower; Patton Oswalt; Matt Walsh; Hamish Linklater
- Opening theme: "Egún" by Danielle Ponder
- Composer: Bryce Dessner
- Country of origin: United States
- Original language: English
- No. of episodes: 7

Production
- Executive producers: Monica Beletsky; Layne Eskridge; Kate Barry; James L. Swanson; Michael Rotenberg; Richard Abate; Frank Smith; Naia Cucukov; Carl Franklin
- Producer: Denise Pinckley
- Production companies: POV Entertainment; Dovetale Productions; Monarch Pictures; Walden Media; 3 Arts Entertainment; Lionsgate Television; Apple Studios

Original release
- Network: Apple TV+
- Release: March 15 – April 19, 2024

Manhunt is an American historical drama miniseries created by showrunner Monica Beletsky, adapted from James L. Swanson's book Manhunt: The 12-Day Chase for Lincoln's Killer. The series follows Edwin Stanton's search for John Wilkes Booth in the aftermath of Abraham Lincoln's assassination. Directed by Carl Franklin and starring Tobias Menzies, the series was produced for Apple TV+, and released on March 15, 2024.

== Premise ==
After President Abraham Lincoln's assassination, his secretary of war and friend Edwin Stanton begins the manhunt to track down Lincoln's assassin John Wilkes Booth.

== Cast and characters ==
=== Main ===
- Tobias Menzies as Edwin Stanton
- Anthony Boyle as John Wilkes Booth
- Lovie Simone as Mary Simms
- Will Harrison as David Herold
- Brandon Flynn as Edwin Stanton Jr.
- Damian O'Hare as Thomas Eckert
- Glenn Morshower as Andrew Johnson
- Patton Oswalt as Lafayette C. Baker
- Matt Walsh as Samuel Mudd
- Hamish Linklater as Abraham Lincoln

=== Supporting ===
- Lili Taylor as Mary Todd Lincoln
- Josh Stewart as Sandford Conover / James Wallace
- C.J. Hoff as Louis J. Weichmann
- Larry Pine as William H. Seward
- Anne Dudek as Ellen Stanton
- Daniel Croix as Joseph "Peanuts" Burroughs
- Spencer Treat Clark as Lewis Powell
- Carrie Lazar as Mary Surratt
- Tommie Turvey as George Atzerodt
- Walker Babington as Edman Spangler
- Josh Mikel as John Surratt
- Joshua Blayne as Frederick W. Seward
- Carlos Luckie Jr. as William Bell
- Maxwell Korn as Robert Todd Lincoln
- Betty Gabriel as Elizabeth Keckley
- Roger Payano as Oswell Swann
- Kevin Patrick Murphy as Lieutenant Luther Baker
- Antonio J Bell as Milo Simms
- Tom McCafferty as Edward Gorsuch
- John Billingsley as Joseph Holt
- Anthony Marble as George Nicholas Sanders
- Christian Robinson as Cuffy Stevens
- Thomas Francis Murphy as Colonel Samuel Cox
- Elvis Nolasco as Frederick Douglass
- Mark Rand as Salmon P. Chase
- Nick Westrate as Edwin Booth
- Bill Kelly as Jonathan Lamson
- Wayne Pére
- William Mark McCullough as Sergeant Boston Corbett
- Judd Lormand as Colonel Everton Conger
- Alex Collins as General William Tecumseh Sherman
- Kevin Mikal Curry as James Thornton
- Justin Kucsulain as Willie Jett
- Helene Henry as Julia Garrett
- Bill Winkler as Jeremiah Dyer
- Craig Nigh as Jefferson Davis
- Robert C. Treveiler as Lorenzo Thomas
- Eric Mendenhall as Oliver Otis Howard

== Episodes ==
No.	Title	Directed by	Written by	Original release date
1	"Pilot"	Carl Franklin	Teleplay by : Monica Beletsky	March 15, 2024
2	"Post Mortem"	Carl Franklin	Teleplay by : Monica Beletsky; Story by : Monica Beletsky & Matt Johnson	March 15, 2024
3	"Let the Sheep Flee"	John Dahl	Monica Beletsky & Ben H. Winters	March 22, 2024
4	"The Secret Line"	John Dahl	Monica Beletsky & Tim Brittain	March 29, 2024
5	"A Man of Destiny"	Eva Sørhaug	Monica Beletsky & Matthew Fennell	April 5, 2024
6	"Useless"	Eva Sørhaug	Monica Beletsky & Jan Oxenberg	April 12, 2024
7	"The Final Act"	Eva Sørhaug	Monica Beletsky	April 19, 2024

== Production ==
In January 2022, a series adaptation of Manhunt: The 12-Day Chase for Lincoln's Killer by James L. Swanson was first announced. The series was created and written by showrunner Monica Beletsky as the first project in her overall deal with Apple, and Carl Franklin would direct. The following month, Anthony Boyle and Lovie Simone were added to the cast, with Boyle portraying John Wilkes Booth. Matt Walsh would be cast as Samuel Mudd in March. Additional casting would be announced in May.

Pre-production for the series began in Savannah, Georgia in February 2022, with filming beginning in May and set to finish by October. Filming of the assassination at Ford's Theatre began on location at the Miller Theater, a historic location in Philadelphia, in June 2022.

The programme was presented as being partly fictionalised, with some characters and events created for dramatic purposes.

== Reception ==
=== Critical response ===
The review aggregator Rotten Tomatoes reported an 87% approval rating with an average rating of 7.3/10, based on 46 critic reviews. The website's critics consensus reads, "Dramatizing a flashpoint in American history with hot-blooded performances and contemporary resonance, Manhunt transcends the trappings of wax museum recreation to deliver addicting entertainment." Metacritic assigned a score of 65 out of 100 based on 22 critics, indicating "generally favorable reviews". Angie Han praised the series' themes and the performances of the cast.

=== Accolades ===
Award	Date of ceremony	Category	Nominee(s)	Result	Ref.
Gotham TV Awards	June 4, 2024	Outstanding Performance in a Limited Series	Tobias Menzies	Nominated	

== See also ==
- The Lincoln Conspiracy (1977)
- The Day Lincoln Was Shot (1998)
- The Conspirator (2010)
- Lincoln (2012)
- Killing Lincoln (2013)
