= 1st District of Columbia Cavalry Regiment =

1st District of Columbia Cavalry
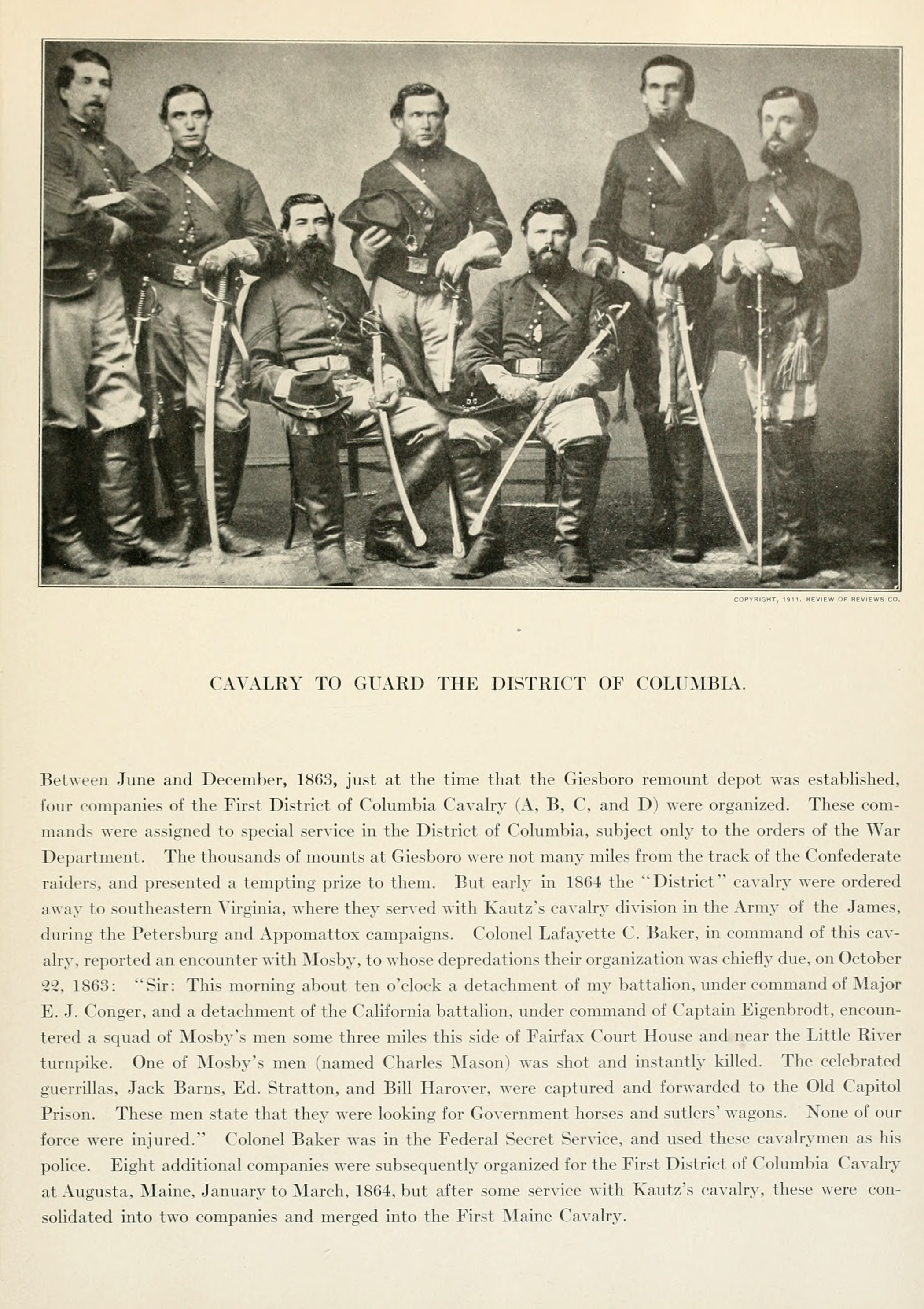
- Active: 1863–1865
- Country: United States of America
- Allegiance: Union
- Branch: Cavalry
- Type: Regiment
- Part of: XXII Corps, Department of Washington; Army of the James
- Engagements: Siege of Petersburg; Appomattox Campaign; Battle of Five Forks

Commanders
- Notable commanders: Lafayette C. Baker

The 1st District of Columbia Cavalry was a Union Army cavalry regiment which fought in the American Civil War. Two leaders of this regiment, Colonel Lafayette C. Baker and Lieutenant Colonel Everton Conger, were eventually involved with the capture of the assassin John Wilkes Booth.

== History ==
Four cavalry companies were formed from June to December 1863, under the command of Colonel Lafayette C. Baker for service in the defenses of Washington, D.C.; in November it was transferred to the Department of Virginia and North Carolina. Eight companies which had been raised in Augusta, Maine were attached to the regiment in early 1864. The regiment participated in the Siege of Petersburg during the remainder of 1864 and early 1865.

In August 1864, seven companies were transferred to the 1st Maine Cavalry, while the rest of the regiment was consolidated into two companies. After fighting in the Appomattox Campaign, the regiment served in garrison roles in Virginia until mustering out on October 26, 1865.

== See also ==
- List of District of Columbia Civil War regiments

== Sources ==
- Civil War in the East
- *Wolfe, Richard A. (Spring 2021). "Tracking Booth: Everton Conger went Down in History for his Role in Capturing John Wilkes Booth. Here's the Story of How He got There". Military Images. 39 (2 (216)): 43–47. JSTOR 26988442.
