= The Lincoln Conspiracy =

The Lincoln Conspiracy could refer to:

- The Lincoln Conspiracy (book), a 1977 book by David W. Balsiger and Charles E. Sellier, Jr.
  - The Lincoln Conspiracy (film), a 1977 film released by Sunn Classic Pictures based on the above book
