= Edward P. Doherty =

Union Army officer

Edward Paul Doherty
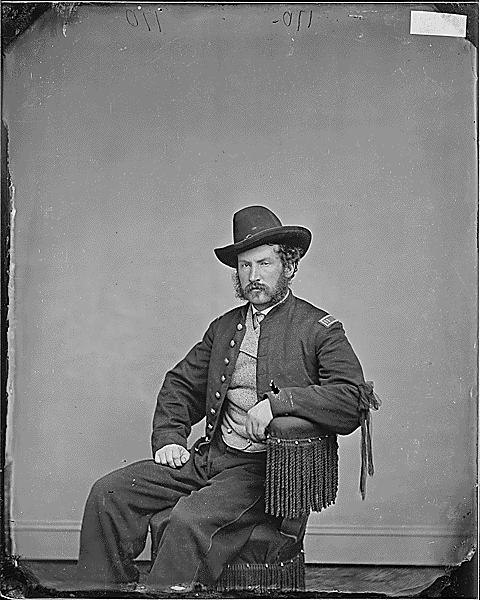
- Edward P. Doherty (1838-1897)
- Born: September 26, 1838; Wickham, Lower Canada
- Died: April 3, 1897 (aged 58); New York City, New York, U.S.
- Burial place: Arlington National Cemetery
- Relatives: Nephew Charles Marcil (Speaker of the Canadian House of Commons)
- Military career
- Allegiance: United States (Union)
- Branch: Union Army / United States Army
- Service years: 1861–1870
- Rank: Captain
- Units: 71st New York Volunteers, 16th New York Cavalry, 3rd New York Provisional Cavalry, 1st and 5th Regular Cavalry
- Commands: Detachment of 16th New York Cavalry that captured John Wilkes Booth
- Conflicts: First Battle of Bull Run, Pursuit of John Wilkes Booth
- Awards: $5,250 reward for capture of John Wilkes Booth
- Other work: Businessman, Inspector of Street Pavings (New York City), Grand Marshal, G.A.R.

Edward Paul Doherty (September 26, 1838 – April 3, 1897) was a Canadian-American American Civil War officer who formed and led the detachment of soldiers that captured and killed John Wilkes Booth, the assassin of US President Abraham Lincoln, in a Virginia barn on April 26, 1865, twelve days after Booth fatally shot Lincoln.

== Early life ==
Doherty was born September 26, 1838, in Wickham, Lower Canada, to immigrant parents from Sligo, Ireland. His birth year was long incorrectly believed to have been 1840 but is clearly recorded as 1838 in Wickham's parish records.

He came to New York State in 1860 and was living there when the American Civil War broke out.

== American Civil War ==
He enlisted in a 90-day militia unit and was assigned as a Private to Company A of the 71st New York Volunteers on April 20, 1861. Assigned to Colonel Ambrose Burnside's 2nd Brigade of Brigadier General David Hunter's 2nd Division, he was captured by the Confederates during the First Battle of Bull Run, the first major land battle of the American Civil War, fought on July 21, 1861, near Manassas, Virginia. While a prisoner, he made a daring escape. The 71st Regiment, along with Doherty, mustered out on August 9, 1861.

Doherty became a captain in the Corcoran Legion, formed by fellow prisoner at the First Battle of Bull Run, Irish-American General Michael Corcoran, who was a close confidant of Abraham Lincoln. Doherty served for two years before being appointed First Lieutenant in the 16th New York Cavalry on September 12, 1863. The regiment was assigned to the defense of Washington, D.C., for the duration of the war, where Doherty distinguished himself as an officer.

== Pursuit and capture of John Wilkes Booth ==
On April 24, 1865, 10 days after the assassination of Abraham Lincoln, Acting Assistant Adjunct General A. R. Sewell sent an order to the Commander of the 16th New York Cavalry, Captain Joseph Schneider, to assign a reliable and discreet commissioned officer with 25 men to report to Colonel L. C. Baker at once. Captain Schneider chose Lieutenant Edward Doherty to lead the group and Doherty reported to Colonel Lafayette C. Baker, Agent of the Department of War.

Doherty and his men were to hunt down John Wilkes Booth and any co-conspirators. Two days later, the men of the 16th NY Cavalry Regiment, accompanied by two detectives of the intelligence service, Luther Baker, cousin of Lafayette C. Baker, and Everton J. Conger, caught up with Booth and his accomplice David E. Herold in a tobacco barn near Port Royal, Virginia, owned by Richard H. Garrett. With the barn surrounded, Doherty called upon Booth to surrender. Booth refused and threatened to shoot anyone who entered.

His accomplice relented and as he surrendered to Doherty, Sergeant Boston Corbett fatally shot Booth through a crack in the side of the barn as the assassin had been aiming to fire at Doherty or Herold. Doherty stated that "the bullet struck Booth in the back of the head, about an inch below the spot where his shot had entered the head of Mr. Lincoln." Booth's spinal cord was severed, and he died two hours later. Doherty and the men of his regiment returned to Washington, D.C., on April 27, 1865, with Booth's body.

== Later military career after ==
For his service in the capture of Abraham Lincoln's assassin, Doherty was promoted to captain and was given a $5,250 reward. He remained in the cavalry. The 16th New York Cavalry was merged with the 13th New York Cavalry to form the 3rd Regiment New York Provisional Cavalry on June 23, 1865, which was mustered out on September 21, 1865.

Seven months later, Doherty joined the regular cavalry. He was assigned to the 5th Regular Cavalry as a Second Lieutenant on April 19, 1866. He was promoted to First Lieutenant on March 1, 1867, in the 1st Cavalry. He remained in the regular army until mustering out on December 27, 1870.

During his last years in the military, he served some time under General George Meade as Inspector General of the Department of Georgia, which had been created by the military in 1865 as part of the Third Military District during the Reconstruction era.

== Later life ==
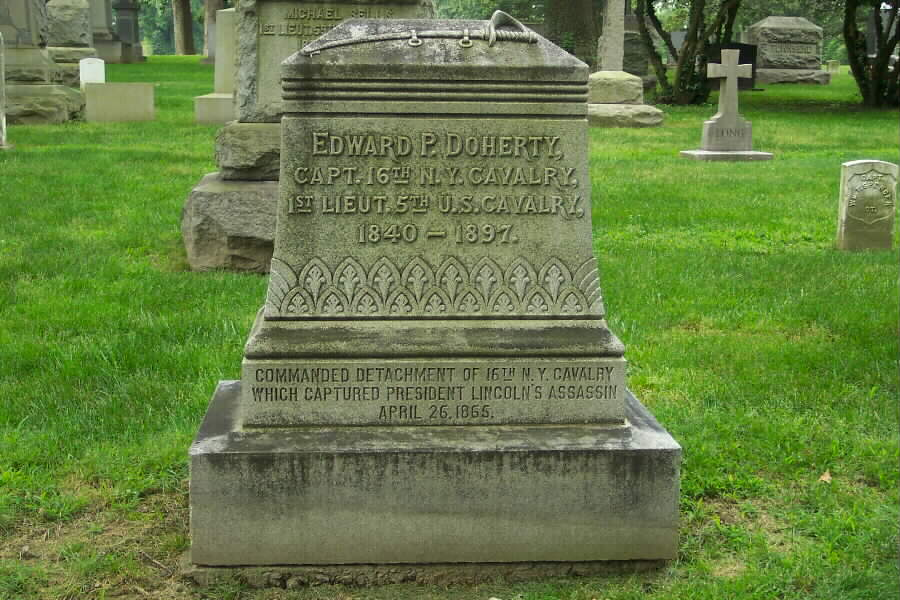
Edward P. Doherty's tombstone. Note the error in the birth year

In 1871, after resigning from the United States Army, Doherty went into business in New Orleans. Having returned to New York City in 1886, he was appointed Inspector of Street Pavings, a position that he held from 1888 until he died in 1897. He was Past Commander of Veteran Post Number 436, G. A. R., and a member of the 71st Regiment Veterans and also of the Press Veterans. He served twice as grand marshal in Memorial Day celebrations.

Doherty succumbed to heart disease in his home at 533 West 144th Street on the morning of April 3, 1897. His funeral was held on April 5, 1897, at the Church of St. Charles Boromeo church, then located at 132nd Street and Seventh Avenue. He is buried in Section 1 of Arlington National Cemetery in Washington, D.C. His tombstone reads: "Commanded detachment of 16th N.Y. Cavalry which captured President Lincoln's assassin April 26, 1865." He is also memorialized on the stone in his family plot in Ireland.

== Family ==
His sister's son, Charles Marcil, was a longtime member of the House of Commons of Canada and served as Speaker of the House from 1909 to 1911.

Another nephew, Georges Marcil, was the last mayor of Notre-Dame-de-Grâce, before the city was annexed to Montreal in 1910.

== See also ==
- Enlisted Canadians in the American Civil War
- Cavalry in the American Civil War
- Assassination of Abraham Lincoln
- John Wilkes Booth
