= The Lincoln Conspiracy (film) =

1977 film by James L. Conway

- Directed by: James L. Conway
- Written by: Jonathan Cobbler
- Based on: The Lincoln Conspiracy by: David W. Balsiger; Charles E. Sellier Jr.
- Produced by: Charles E. Sellier Jr.
- Starring: Bradford Dillman; John Dehner; Robert Middleton; Whit Bissell; John Anderson
- Cinematography: Hening Schellerup
- Distributed by: Sunn Classic Pictures
- Release date: October 5, 1977
- Running time: 90 minutes
- Country: United States
- Language: English
- Box office: $5.6 million (US and Canada rentals)

The Lincoln Conspiracy is a 1977 drama film directed by James L. Conway that dramatizes certain conspiracy theories concerning the 1865 assassination of U.S. President Abraham Lincoln. Adapted from the 1977 book of the same name by David W. Balsiger and Charles E. Sellier Jr., the production stars Robert Middleton as Secretary of War Edwin M. Stanton, John Dehner as Colonel Lafayette C. Baker, Bradford Dillman as John Wilkes Booth, Ted Henning as Robert Campbell, and John Anderson as Lincoln.

The hypothesis of the film is that, far from being the work of the ringleader of a lonely band of Confederate-sympathizing fanatics as most historians agree that it was, Lincoln's assassination was the result of a vast conspiracy involving Secretary of War Edwin Stanton, Chief of National Police Colonel Lafayette Baker, and various Northern Senators and politicians who were determined to stop Lincoln from carrying out his lenient Reconstruction policies towards the South. The movie further proposes that the man killed at Garrett's farm in Virginia was not actually John Wilkes Booth, but instead was another man named James William Boyd.

== Production ==
Parts of the film were shot in Park City, Utah.

== Distribution ==
Sunn Classic Pictures departed from its normal four wall distribution strategy to demand up-front guarantees from theatres.

== See also ==
- The Lincoln Conspiracy (book)
- National Treasure: Book of Secrets (2007 movie with similar plot)
