= Nick Westrate =

American actor and director

- Born: Cassopolis, Michigan, U.S.
- Education: Juilliard School
- Occupations: Actor, director
- Notable work: Turn: Washington's Spies; Manhunt
- Awards: Drama Desk Special Award

Nick Westrate is an American actor and director known for his work in theater, television, and film. He is the recipient of a special Drama Desk Award for versatility in Off-Broadway performance.

== Early life and education ==
Westrate grew up in southern Michigan and studied acting at the Juilliard School in New York.

== Career ==
=== Theater ===
Westrate has appeared on Broadway in Bernhardt/Hamlet opposite Janet McTeer, Harvey Fierstein's Casa Valentina, and A Moon for the Misbegotten.

Off-Broadway, he has appeared in Tribes at the Barrow Street Theatre, A Delicate Ship at Playwrights Realm, Galileo and Unnatural Acts at Classic Stage Company, Love's Labor's Lost at the Public Theater, and Ivo van Hove's production of The Little Foxes at New York Theatre Workshop.

In 2023, Westrate played Prior Walter in János Szász's production of Angels in America at Arena Stage in Washington, D.C., for which he received a Helen Hayes Award for Best Ensemble and was nominated for Best Actor.

In summer 2026, Westrate played Iago in Classical Theatre of Harlem's production of Othello at Marcus Garvey Park, directed by Carl Cofield.

=== Television and film ===
Westrate played Robert Townsend on the AMC series Turn: Washington's Spies for three seasons. He has also appeared in the HBO miniseries Mildred Pierce, directed by Todd Haynes, and The American Guest, directed by Bruno Barreto, as well as the Apple TV+ miniseries Manhunt, in which he played Edwin Booth.

On film, he appeared in Jonathan Demme's Ricki and the Flash opposite Meryl Streep, and in American Insurrection.

=== The Streetcar Project ===
Westrate co-founded and directs The Streetcar Project with Lucy Owen, a touring production of Tennessee Williams's A Streetcar Named Desire performed with four actors and no sets, costumes, or props, in unconventional venues including barns, warehouses, churches, and airplane hangars. The production has been reviewed by The Washington Post, the San Francisco Chronicle, Local News Matters, and Stage and Cinema.

== Selected filmography ==
Year	Title	Role	Medium	Notes
2011	Mildred Pierce	Sammy Forrester	Television	Miniseries
2015–2017	Turn: Washington's Spies	Robert Townsend	Television	3 seasons
2015	Ricki and the Flash	Adam	Film	Feature film
2021	The American Guest	George Perkins	Television	Television series
2021	American Insurrection	David	Film	Feature film
2024	Manhunt	Edwin Booth	Television	Miniseries

== Awards ==
Year	Award	Category	Work	Result
2023	Helen Hayes Award	Best Ensemble	Angels in America	Won
2023	Helen Hayes Award	Best Actor	Angels in America	Nominated
2012	Drama Desk Award	Special Award for Versatility	Unnatural Acts, Love's Labor's Lost, Galileo	Won
2011	St. Clair Bayfield Award	Supporting Actor (Shakespeare)	Love's Labour's Lost	Won
2010	Drama Desk Award	Featured Actor in a Play	The Boys in the Band	Nominated
