= James William Boyd =

American Confederate military officer (1822–1866)

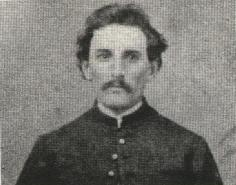
- An alleged photograph of Boyd from the early 1860s
- Born: 1822; Hopkinsville, Kentucky, U.S.A.
- Died: after 1865; Jackson, Tennessee, C.S.A.
- Military career
- Allegiance: Confederate States of America
- Branch: Confederate States Army
- Rank: Captain
- Unit: Company F of the 6th Tennessee Infantry Regiment
- Conflicts: American Civil War

James William Boyd (1822 – after 1865) was an American Confederate military officer who was alleged in a conspiracy theory to have been killed in the place of John Wilkes Booth, the assassin of U.S. President Abraham Lincoln, due to their resemblance.

Boyd was born in Hopkinsville, Kentucky, in 1822, and lived in Jackson, Tennessee, where he married Caroline A. Malone in 1845, and had seven children. Boyd was a captain in the 6th Tennessee Infantry Regiment of Confederate States Army, Company F, during the American Civil War.

Boyd was captured at Jackson in 1863 and held as a prisoner of war by the Union. In December 1864, while a prisoner of war, he requested permission to be released so he could return home to take care of his seven motherless children. Boyd's wife Caroline had died while he was incarcerated. Edwin M. Stanton, the United States Secretary of War, approved Boyd's petition on February 14, 1865. Boyd's official whereabouts following his release remain a mystery. His son James received a letter to meet Boyd in Brownsville, Texas, for a trip to Mexico, but Boyd never showed up for the rendezvous and no further contact was ever received from him.

== Alleged role in the Lincoln conspiracy ==
According to a theory put forth by the 1977 book and subsequent film The Lincoln Conspiracy, Boyd was mistaken for John Wilkes Booth and killed on April 26, 1865, at Richard Garrett's farm, near Bowling Green, Virginia. The theory adds that the U.S. government was aware of the error, but covered it up and, thus, enabled Booth to escape to freedom.

James L. Swanson counters this claim by stating, "The survival myth of John Wilkes Booth, roaming across the land, evokes the traditional fate of the damned, of a cursed spirit who can find no rest. There is no doubt that Booth was the man who died at Garrett's farm."

== Death ==
Boyd's death is widely disputed amongst historians. Conventional accounts assert that he was murdered in 1866.
