= Henry Martyn Lazelle =

American military officer (1832–1917)

- Henry M. Lazelle
- Born: September 8, 1832; Worcester, Massachusetts, US
- Died: July 21, 1917 (aged 84); Georgeville, Quebec
- Military career
- Allegiance: United States of America; Union
- Branch: United States Army; Union Army
- Service years: 1855–1894
- Rank: Colonel
- Commands: 16th New York Cavalry Regiment; Commandant of Cadets; 23rd U.S. Infantry Regiment
- Conflicts: American Civil War; Indian Wars
- Other work: author

Henry Martyn Lazelle (September 8, 1832 – July 21, 1917) was a career officer in the United States Army. In addition to serving during the American Civil War and Indian Wars, he was Commandant of Cadets at the United States Military Academy from 1879 to 1882.

== Early life and education ==
He was born Henry Martyn Lazell in Enfield, Massachusetts, where he went to the public schools.

He was orphaned at the age of four and raised by family members of friends. He entered the United States Military Academy in 1850 and was roommates with James MacNeil Whistler, the future artist. After graduating in 1855, he spelled his last name as Lazelle.

== Military career ==
Later that year, Lazelle was commissioned a second lieutenant in the 8th US Infantry, and stationed at Fort Bliss, Texas. In February 1859, while on a scouting mission, he was in a skirmish with Mescalero Apaches and shot through the lungs. He was promoted to first lieutenant in April 1861.

Posted in Texas at Fort Bliss at the outbreak of the American Civil War, Lazelle and his comrades were taken prisoner by Texas insurgents in May 1861. He was held until exchanged in July 1862, during which time he was promoted to captain. From then until October 1863, he served in Washington, D.C., as Assistant Commissary General of Prisoners of War.

From October 1863 to October 1864, he served as colonel of the 16th Regiment New York Volunteer Cavalry, operating against Mosby's Rangers in the Upper South. He resigned his volunteer commission in October 1864. He served as Inspector General on the staff of General Frederick Steele until February 1865, as Assistant Provost Marshal for the Division of the Mississippi until July 1865, and on recruiting service until March 1866.

== Postbellum career ==
Lazelle rejoined the 8th Infantry on Reconstruction duty in the Second Military District, North and South Carolina, from March 1866 to October 1870. He was also posted with the regiment at Davids Island from October 1870 to July 1872.

He went to the West on assignment to the Department of the Platte from July 1872 until May 1874, as the Army's responsibilities shifted to protecting emigrants to the west and subduing Native Americans. From September 1874 to March 1875, he was commander of Fort Yuma. He was promoted to major of the 1st Infantry in December 1874, and joined that regiment in the Department of Dakota in June 1875. In 1877, Lazelle led a pursuit of Lame Deer's band of Lakota Sioux, and in 1878, he established Fort Meade (South Dakota).

In May 1879, he was named Commandant of Cadets at the United States Military Academy, and was promoted to lieutenant colonel of the 23rd Infantry in June 1881.

He joined the 23rd Infantry in December 1882 at Fort Craig, where he served as commander until February 1884. After serving as an inspector for the Division of the Pacific and the Department of the Columbia, Lazelle represented the U. S. Army as an observer during the maneuvers of the British Army in India from November 1885 to March 1886. He returned to the Department of the Columbia as Assistant Inspector General until May 1887. Assigned to command the publication of the Official Records of the American Civil War, he returned to Washington, D.C. He was promoted to colonel of the 18th Infantry in February 1889; he served as commander of the regiment and of the post of Fort Clark until July 1894. He retired due to disability in November 1894.

== Marriage and later life ==
Lazelle married and had a family. One of their sons, Jacob, also went to West Point and served under his father at Fort. Bliss. Jacob died in 1898, on the way to Manila, Philippines in the Spanish–American War.

Colonel Lazelle's wife died at Fort Clark, Texas, in January, 1893. After retiring from the Army, Lazelle moved to Virginia, where he farmed until 1898. After that, he resided alternately in Canada and Massachusetts. In April 1904, he was promoted to brigadier general on the retired list. Later that year he remarried.

He wrote a number of books, including One Law in Nature: A New Corpuscular Theory, Comprehending Unity of Force, Identity of Matter, & Its Multiple Atom Constitution: Applied to the Physical Affections Or Modes of Energy and Matter, Force, and Spirit; or, Scientific Evidence of a Supreme Intelligence (1895).

Lazelle died on July 21, 1917, at Georgeville, Quebec.

Military offices
Preceded by Thomas H. Neill	Commandant of Cadets of the United States Military Academy; 1879–1882	Succeeded by Henry C. Hasbrouck
