= Topeka State Hospital =

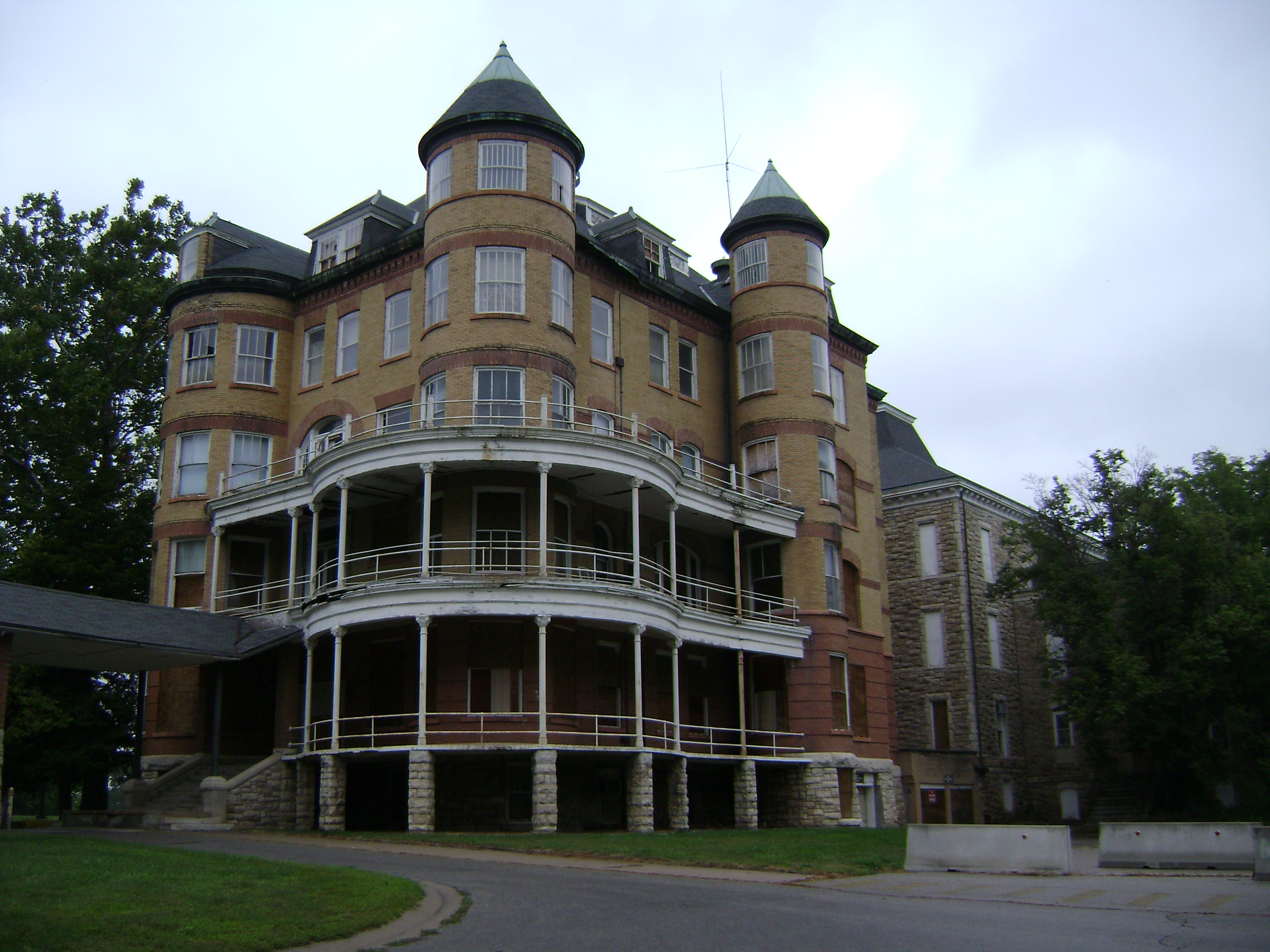
- Topeka State Hospital, taken 2008

Geography
- Location: Topeka, Kansas, United States
- Coordinates: 39.064722°N 95.710973°W

History
- Founded: 1872
- Closed: 1997
- Demolished: 2010

Links
- Lists: Hospitals in Kansas

The Topeka State Hospital (formerly the Topeka Insane Asylum) was a publicly funded institution for the care and treatment of the mentally ill in Topeka, Kansas. It was in operation from 1872 to 1997. Located at 2700 W 6th Street, the hospital opened in 1879, after the Osawatomie State Hospital, once thought to be sufficient, became overcrowded with mentally-ill patients.

The first buildings in both Topeka and Osawatomie were designed by John G. Haskell who was among the architects of the Kansas State Capitol, and the hospital was designed in according to the Kirkbride Plan.

As of 2010, the majority of the hospital had been demolished. In June 2010, the center building was demolished.

== History ==
In 1872, the hospital started operations.

Boston Corbett, who shot John Wilkes Booth in response to assassination of Abraham Lincoln, was committed here after being declared insane in 1887. Corbett escaped the asylum in 1888.

=== Patient treatment ===
By the early 1900s, there were rumors of patients being abused, neglected, or raped. Patients were often left confined or chained for long periods of time. In the 1940s, reforms took place at the hospital. In 1951, the hospital received further criticism for treatment of patients when it was discovered that patient John Crabb, a fifty-nine-year-old immigrant from Denmark, was not clinically insane, and had been wrongfully incarcerated at the hospital.

=== Forced sterilizations ===
In 1913, the Kansas legislature passed the first sterilization law in the state. In 1917, in an attempt to make the process of the law easier, a second law was passed, which eliminated some of the work for the institutions. The 1913 law was directed at "habitual criminals, idiots, epileptics, imbeciles, and insane". The 1917 law targeted the same groups, but eliminated the courts' approval from the decision.

After the passage of the sterilization law in 1913, 54 sterilizations occurred over the next seven years. Because there was still a great deal of doubt and uncertainty regarding the laws, sterilizations occurred at a relatively slow rate up until 1921. With the passage of new laws and a new widespread acceptance, sterilizations began to increase rapidly until 1950. The rate of sterilization decreased steadily until 1961, when they ceased altogether. The rate of sterilizations per 100,000 residents per year during the peak period of sterilizations, in the mid 1930s, was about 10. Early on, most of Kansas' forced sterilizations took place in the State Hospital in Topeka.

=== Murder of Stephanie Uhlrig ===
Stephanie Uhlrig worked as a music and activity therapist in the general hospital population. One of the patients at Topeka State Hospital was Kenneth D. Waddell, who had been placed in the custody of state mental health authorities after having been found not guilty by reason of insanity for the charge of aggravated battery. Waddell was initially placed in the Larned State Security Hospital. On April 1, 1987, he was transferred to the Topeka State Hospital, where he was placed in the Adult Forensic Ward (referred to as the "AWL unit"), which was a special unit secluded from the other units because it contained higher risk patients. This unit was closed due to budgetary constraints, and Waddell was eventually moved into the general population.

On February 23, 1992, Uhlrig and another therapist took Waddell and other patients off grounds to watch a movie. Upon returning to the hospital and dropping off the other patients, Waddell attacked and killed Uhlrig. Her body was found in the bathroom in one of the buildings on the grounds.

The United States Court of Appeals, Tenth Circuit, decided on August 30, 1995 that "While Uhlrig's murder was undeniably tragic, it was not the result of reckless and "conscience shocking" conduct by the state mental health administrators sued in the instant case," thus affirming the district court's grant of the defendant's motion for "summary judgment."

=== Turnbull v. Topeka State Hospital and the State of Kansas ===
In 2001, Cynthia Turnbull, a psychologist at the Topeka State Hospital, sued her employer and the state for sexual harassment after she was sexually assaulted by a patient. The jury found a sexually hostile work environment existed at TSH, but it split over whether TSH should be held legally responsible for that environment. After learning of the jury's inability to decide, the district court granted an earlier defense motion for judgment as a matter of law. The sole issue on appeal was whether that ruling was proper. They held that it was not, and remanded the case for further proceedings.

=== Closure ===
In 1988, the hospital lost its accreditation to receive federal Medicare and Medicaid payments. The Health Care Financing Administration determined that the State had omitted two patients from its inspection of care review at the hospital, which appealed and lost.

By the 1990s, the mental health movement was away from the hospital model and toward community-based programs. Partly because the community-based model appeared effective but mostly because it was cheaper, the Kansas Legislature decided to close one of its three mental hospitals. TSH was chosen for closing and went out of business May 17, 1997.

The historic center building and several others were demolished in June 2010.

== Cemetery ==
The cemetery occupies a 2.8-acre plot on the northeast corner of the old Topeka State Hospital grounds. It contains the bodies of patients buried there over a 75-year period. The cemetery measures about 150 yards by 50 yards, and is about 100 yards west of the 100 block of N.W. MacVicar, was assigned to the Kansas Department of Administration after the hospital closed.

Of the 1,157 graves there, only 16 have headstones. During the 1999/2000 session, the Kansas Legislature authorized construction of a memorial for people buried in the cemetery, including a plaque identifying the memorial, fencing to go around the cemetery and the inscription of the names of the dead.
