= 3rd New York Provisional Cavalry Regiment =

- New York flag
- Active: August 17, 1865, to September 21, 1865
- Country: United States
- Allegiance: Union
- Branch: Cavalry

The 3rd New York Provisional Cavalry Regiment was a cavalry regiment that served in the Union Army at the end of the American Civil War.

== Service ==
On August 17, 1865, the 13th New York Volunteer Cavalry was consolidated with the 16th New York Volunteer Cavalry to form the 3rd New York Provisional Cavalry. Col. Nelson B. Sweitzer, commanding officer of the 16th New York, was appointed commander of the new regiment.

The 3rd Provisional NY Cavalry was honorably discharged and mustered out on September 21, 1865, at Camp Barry near Washington, D. C., having lost by death from disease and other causes, four enlisted men.

== See also ==
- List of New York Civil War regiments
