= Everton Conger =

American judge

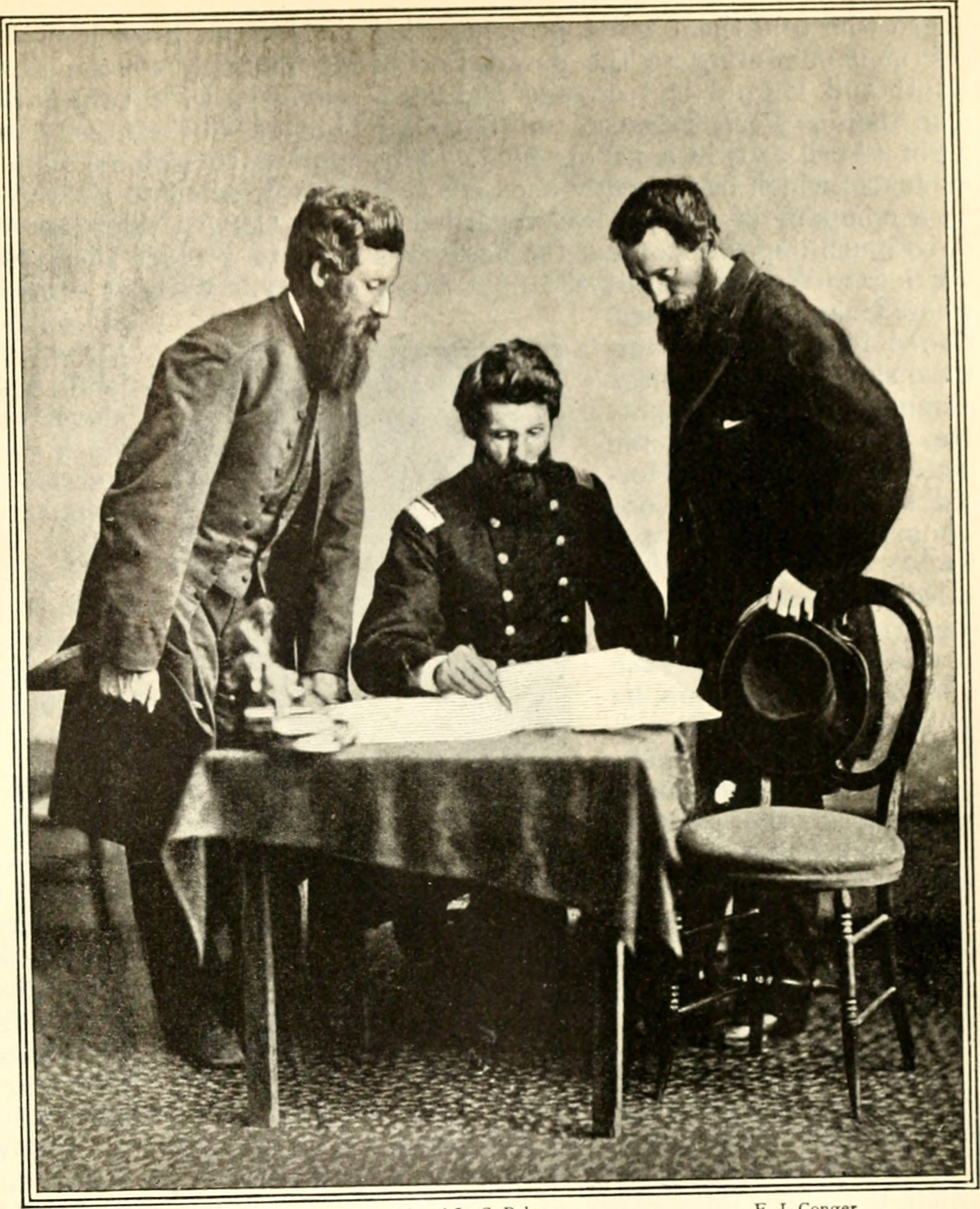
Hq of the Secret Service Bureau, Washington D.C. Lt L B. Baker. Col Lafayetter C Baker and E. J. Conger planning the pursuit of Booth

Everton Judson Conger (April 25, 1834 – July 12, 1918) was an American officer during the Civil War who was instrumental in the capture of John Wilkes Booth, the assassin of President Abraham Lincoln, in a Virginia barn twelve days after Lincoln was shot.

== Biography ==
Everton Conger was born in Huron County, Ohio, in 1834. He was the son of Rev. Enoch Conger, a Presbyterian minister. In 1856, he moved to Fremont, Ohio, where he established a dental practice.

Conger enlisted in the Union army during the Civil War, initially as a private in the three-months 8th Ohio Infantry. When his term of enlistment expired, he returned to Fremont. On October 16, 1861, he married Emma "Kate" Boren, with whom he had five children. He later became a captain in the 3rd West Virginia Cavalry and eventually rose to the rank of lieutenant colonel of the 1st District of Columbia Cavalry. He suffered three severe wounds during combat and was assigned to detached duty in Washington, D.C., joining General Lafayette Baker's intelligence service as a detective.

John Wilkes Booth's escape route, tracked by Everton Conger and a Union army detachment

Following the assassination of President Lincoln on April 14, 1865, Conger was ordered to accompany a detachment of 25 Union soldiers from the 16th New York Cavalry Regiment, led by Lieutenant Edward P. Doherty. The soldiers pursued Booth through Southern Maryland and across the Potomac and Rappahannock rivers to Richard Garrett's farm, just south of Port Royal, Caroline County, Virginia. Booth and his accomplice, David E. Herold, had been led to the farm by William Storke "Willie" Jett, formerly a private in the 9th Virginia Cavalry, whom they had met before crossing the Rappahannock.

Conger tracked down Jett and interrogated him, learning of Booth's location at the Garrett farm, and led the soldiers there. Arriving early in the morning of April 26, 1865, the soldiers found Booth and Herold hiding in a tobacco barn. Although Herold surrendered, Booth refused.

Conger set fire to the barn and Sergeant Boston Corbett mortally wounded Booth by shooting him in the neck. Booth was dragged from the barn and died on the porch of the Garrett farmhouse.

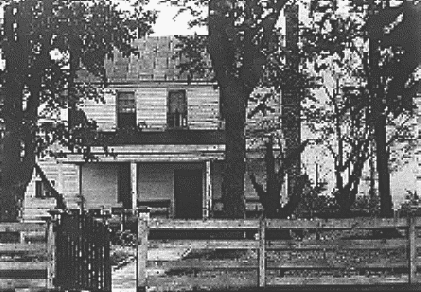
The porch of the Garrett farmhouse, where Booth died in 1865

Conger removed Booth's personal effects, including a diary. Conger was given $15,000 as a reward for the successful operation. The city of Fremont gave him a pair of inscribed silver-handled pistols in recognition for his role in tracking down Booth.

Conger moved to Illinois, built a home, and practiced law in Carmi. Later he was appointed a United States District Court judge in the Montana Territory. He eventually moved to Hawaii to live with his daughter, dying there on July 12, 1918. He is buried in Mountain View Cemetery, Dillon, Montana.

Political offices
Preceded by Henry N. Blake	Associate Justice of the Montana Supreme Court; 1880–1884	Succeeded by John Coburn

== See also ==
- Edward P. Doherty
