= 16th New York Cavalry Regiment =

- New York flag
- Active: June 19, 1863, to August 17, 1865
- Country: United States
- Allegiance: Union
- Branch: Cavalry
- Nickname: Sprague Light Cavalry
- Engagements: American Civil War: Gettysburg campaign; Battle of Bristoe Station; Capture of John Wilkes Booth

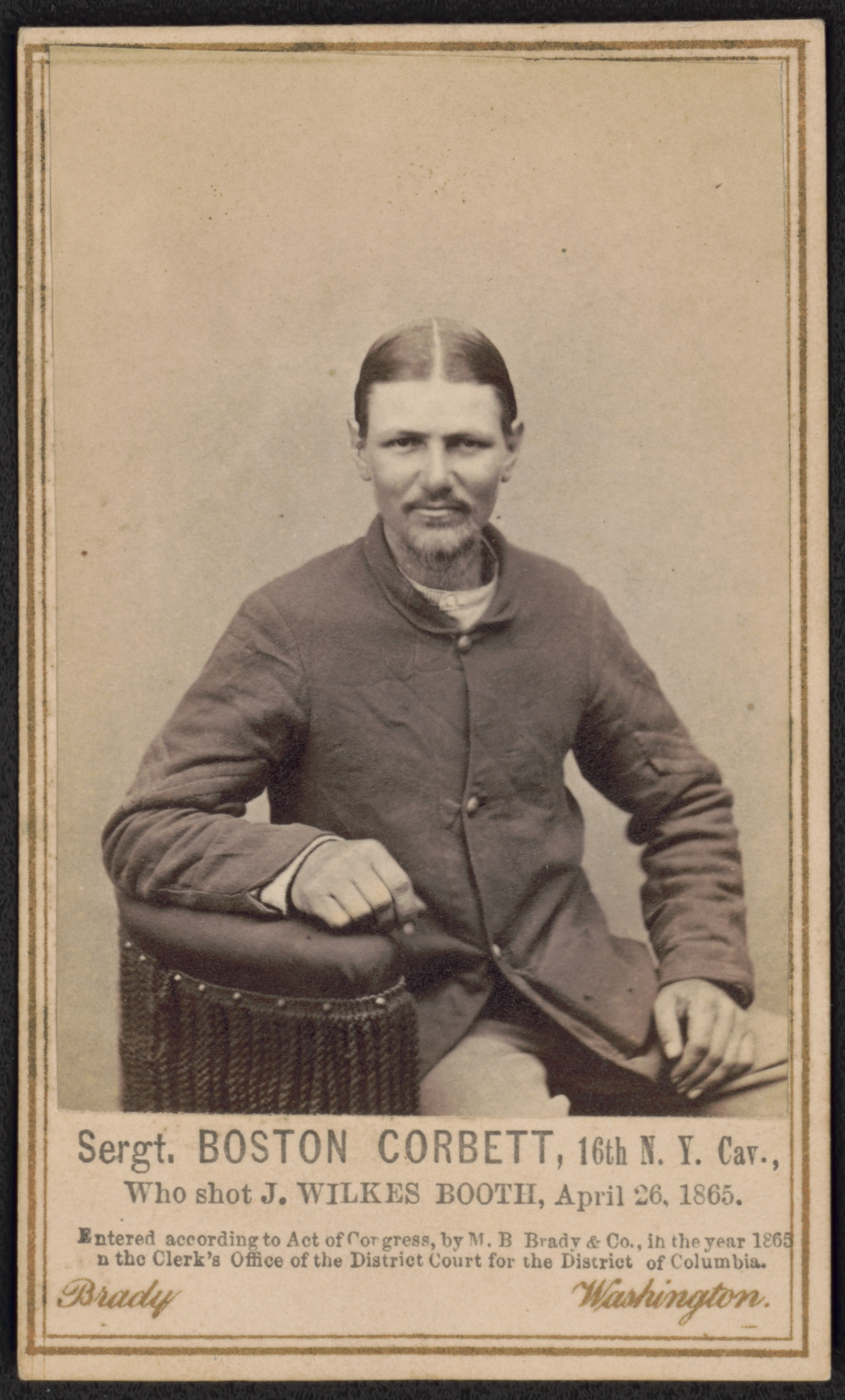
Sergeant Boston Corbett, 16th New York Cavalry, who shot John Wilkes Booth, April 26, 1865. From the Liljenquist Family Collection of Civil War Photographs, Prints and Photographs Division, Library of Congress. Photograph by Mathew Brady

The 16th New York Cavalry Regiment was a cavalry regiment that served in the Union Army during the American Civil War. A detachment of the 16th New York had the distinction of killing Lincoln assassin John Wilkes Booth and apprehending accomplice David Herold.

== Service ==
The regiment was organized in Plattsburgh, New York, and mustered into service from June 19 to September 15, 1863. Consisting of eleven companies of cavalry, Companies A, B, C, and D of the 16th New York took part in the Gettysburg campaign. The regiment was then dispatched to the defense of Washington, D.C., and assigned to the Cavalry Brigade of the XXII Corps of the Department of Washington.

Until the end of the Civil War, the 16th New York was repeatedly in action in Northern Virginia and fought a number of engagements against Confederate cavalry commanded by John Singleton Mosby. On August 8, 1864, Capt. James H. Fleming of Company M was killed in action near Fairfax, Virginia. Fleming was the only officer of the 16th New York Cavalry to die in the Civil War.

Before dawn on April 26, 1865, a detachment of the 16th New York Cavalry under the command of Lt. Edward P. Doherty cornered Lincoln assassins Booth and Herold in a tobacco barn near Port Royal, Virginia. Herold surrendered but Booth refused and was shot by Sgt. Boston Corbett. Each of the 26 enlisted men of the 16th Cavalry that participated in the capture received $1,658.58 in reward money.

On August 17, 1865, the 16th New York Cavalry was consolidated with the 13th Regiment New York Volunteer Cavalry; the new organization receiving the designation, 3rd Regiment New York Provisional Cavalry.

== Mail-in ballot fraud scheme ==
In the fall of 1864, Orville Wood, a merchant from Clinton County and supporter of Abraham Lincoln in the 1864 presidential election, was tasked to visit hometown troops and "look after the local ticket." After seeing evidence of mail-in ballot fraud in another regiment and a hospital, Wood gained the trust of Moses Ferry, representative of Democratic governor Horatio Seymour in Baltimore, and set out to expose the fraud. At Ferry's direction, Wood forged signatures of the 16th New York Cavalry while a clerk sat across from him signing ballots with names from a roster Wood brought from home. Wood reported this and other such operations he discovered to authorities, and less than two weeks before the election on October 27, 1864, Ferry and another political operative named Edward Donahue Jr. were tried before a military commission. Ferry confessed and offered up names of other conspirators, while Donahue continued to trial and was convicted, partly on Wood's testimony. Both were sentenced to life in prison, with Lincoln's approval.

== Total strength and casualties ==
The regiment suffered 1 officer and 20 enlisted men who were killed in action or mortally wounded and 119 enlisted men who died of disease, for a total of 140 fatalities.

== Commanders ==
- Colonel Henry M. Lazelle
- Colonel Nelson Bowman Sweitzer

== See also ==
- List of New York Civil War regiments
