= James L. Swanson =

American historian (1959–2025)

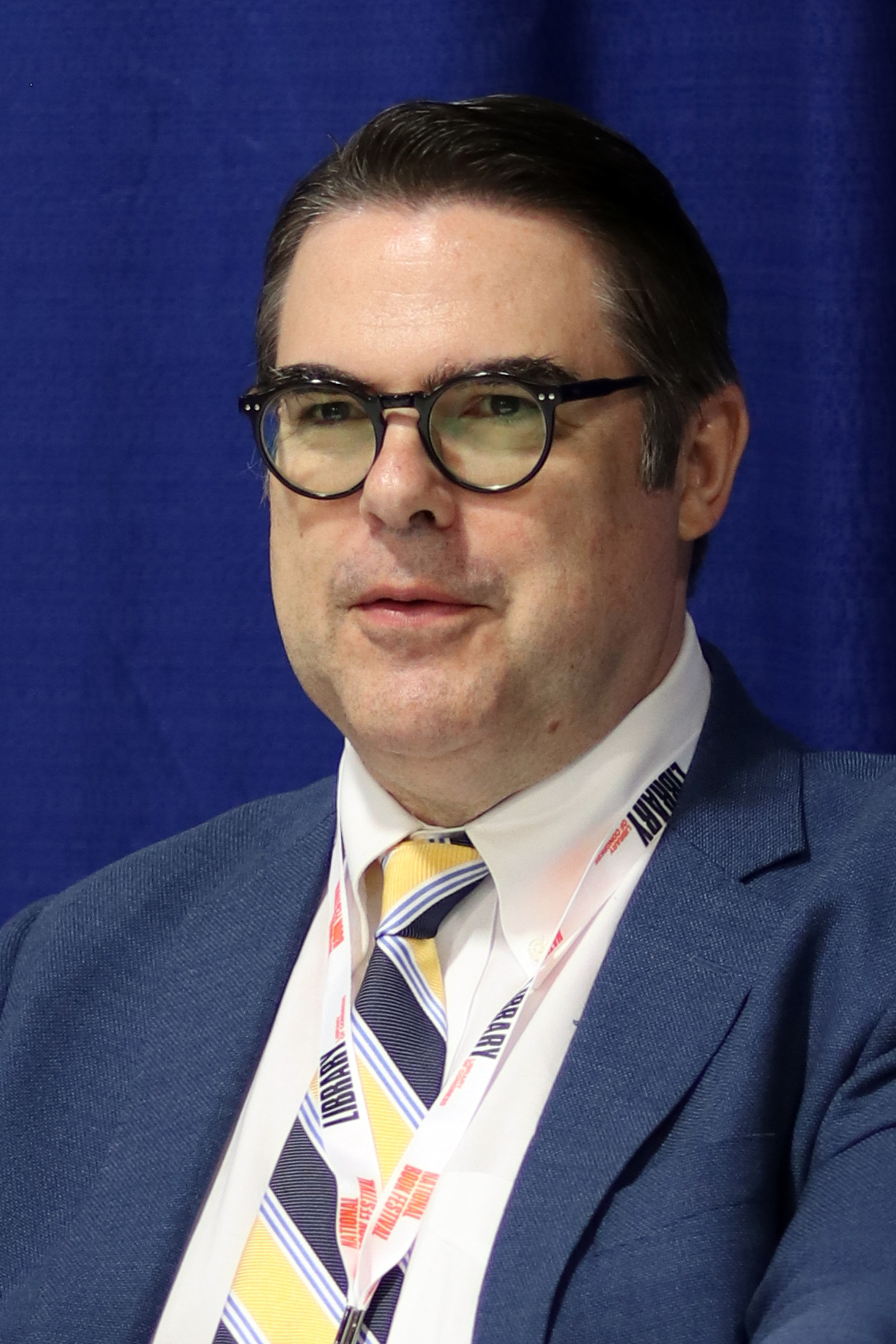
- Swanson in 2018
- Born: February 12, 1959; Chicago, Illinois, U.S.
- Died: April 21, 2025 (aged 66); Chicago, Illinois, U.S.
- Education: University of Chicago (A.B.); University of California, Los Angeles (J.D.)
- Occupation: writer

James L. Swanson (February 12, 1959 – April 21, 2025) was an American author and historian famous for his New York Times best-seller Manhunt: The 12-Day Chase for Lincoln's Killer, focusing on the biography of John Wilkes Booth and his plot to kill Lincoln and other cabinet members. For this book he earned an Edgar Award. He was a Senior Fellow at the Heritage Foundation and appeared on C-SPAN on behalf of the Koch-affiliated libertarian CATO Institute think tank.

== Early life and education ==
Swanson was born on February 12, 1959. He graduated from the University of Chicago with a bachelor's degree in history and from the University of California, Los Angeles School of Law with a J.D. degree. He held a number of government and think-tank posts in Washington, D.C., including at the United States Department of Justice. He served on the advisory council of the Ford's Theatre Society.

== Career ==
Swanson was an Abraham Lincoln scholar and a member of the Lincoln Bicentennial Commission. His main area of research was on the Lincoln assassination. He also served in the U.S. Department of Justice.

His book Manhunt was to be adapted by David Simon and Tom Fontana for a mini-series in 2008. It was finally adapted into a miniseries without Simon and Fontana's involvement in 2024, created by Monica Beletsky.

== Death ==
Swanson died from cancer in Chicago, on April 21, 2025, at the age of 66. His death was announced by The CATO Institute that same day.

== Bibliography ==
=== Books ===
- Manhunt: The 12-Day Chase for Lincoln's Killer. 2007. ISBN 9780060518493
- Chasing Lincoln's Killer: The Search for John Wilkes Booth. 2008. ISBN 9780439903547
- Bloody Times: the Funeral for Abraham Lincoln and the Manhunt for Jefferson Davis. 2010. ISBN 9780061560897
- Bloody Crimes: The Chase for Jefferson Davis and the Death Pageant for Lincoln's Corpse. 2010. ISBN 9780061233784
- "The President Has Been Shot!": The Assassination of John F. Kennedy. 2013. ISBN 9780545490078
- End of Days: The Assassination of John F. Kennedy 2013. ISBN 0062083481.
- Chasing King's Killer: The Hunt for Martin Luther King, Jr.'s Assassin, 2018. ISBN 978-0545723336
- The Deerfield Massacre: A Surprise Attack, a Forced March, and the Fight for Survival in Early America, 2024. ISBN 978-1501108167
