= The Lincoln Conspiracy (book) =

Book by David W. Balsiger and Charles E. Sellier, Jr.

- Cover of paperback edition
- Author: David W. Balsiger, Charles E. Sellier
- Language: English
- Subject: Abraham Lincoln
- Publisher: Schick Sunn Classic Books
- Publication date: 1977
- ISBN: 978-0-917214-03-5
- OCLC: 3308424
- Dewey Decimal: 364.1/524
- LC Class: E457.5 .B29

The Lincoln Conspiracy is a book by David W. Balsiger and Charles E. Sellier, Jr. promoting certain conspiracy theories concerning the 1865 assassination of U.S. President Abraham Lincoln.

== Major themes and arguments ==
=== Cover-up of the plan to kidnap Lincoln ===
The central premise of the book is that "traditional" historians have perpetuated a cover-up, originally orchestrated by Lincoln's Secretary of War Edwin M. Stanton (D) and some Radical Republican allies in 1865, by over-reliance on false documentation produced by Stanton and his conspirators. This was done, the book argues, to disguise the fact that Stanton, Union spy Lafayette C. Baker, Senator Benjamin F. Wade, Senator John Conness, other congressional Radical Republicans, and a group of Northern bankers and speculators were all involved in a plot to kidnap Lincoln. Lincoln was then intended to be hidden for a time while bogus articles of impeachment would be drafted to remove him as President. The primary motivations for this supposed plot would have been strong opposition to Lincoln's generous Reconstruction plans and the loss of profits due to Lincoln's restrictions on the cotton trade during the U.S. Civil War.

=== Kidnapping changes to assassination ===
The book then states that in 1864, Baker uncovered the plans of Lincoln's future assassin, John Wilkes Booth, to kidnap Lincoln with the help of a different group of conspirators with different motives. The Stanton group, through Baker and Conness, supposedly provided Booth with money and information on Lincoln's movements. After several abortive attempts, Booth was ordered to halt his efforts in March 1865, and made no further attempts to kidnap Lincoln, but secretly resolved to murder him instead, the book alleges.

=== Booth's "incriminating" diary ===
Lincoln's assassination by Booth on April 14 is said to have thrown Stanton and his allies into a panic, fearing that their involvement in the kidnap plots would be exposed. A frantic search soon turned up Booth's coat, which contained a highly incriminating diary documenting meetings with several members of the Stanton group. A few days later on April 26, a Confederate double agent (James William Boyd), mistakenly identified as Booth, was shot and killed in Virginia, according to the authors. Stanton, aware of the mistaken identity, allegedly saw to it that the autopsy records were altered to remove or obscure descriptions of the body not consistent with Booth. Booth's diary, now in Stanton's personal possession, is said to have had 13 pages of incriminating references removed. Baker quietly pursued the hunt for Booth as far as Harper's Ferry, West Virginia, where the trail went cold.

At the military trials of Booth's conspirators (theorized to not have been members of the Stanton group), held in May and June 1865, the proceedings were rushed, the government produced witnesses against the defendants who the authors suggest were paid, and even the trial records were supposedly altered. Four of Booth's co-conspirators were hanged on July 7, 1865. Others received long prison sentences, but Booth himself, the book concludes, eventually escaped to England, his whereabouts after that uncertain.

== Cold reception by historians ==
The Lincoln Conspiracy was greeted with hostility and derision from academic historians. Many objections were raised against the book's sensational theories and the authors' use (and misuse) of source materials. The Lincoln Conspiracy is often considered a form of negationist or even alternate history.

The Lincoln Conspiracy was the basis of the 1977 film of the same name by Sunn Classic Pictures, the publishing division of which also released the book.
