= Lafayette C. Baker =

Union Army officer

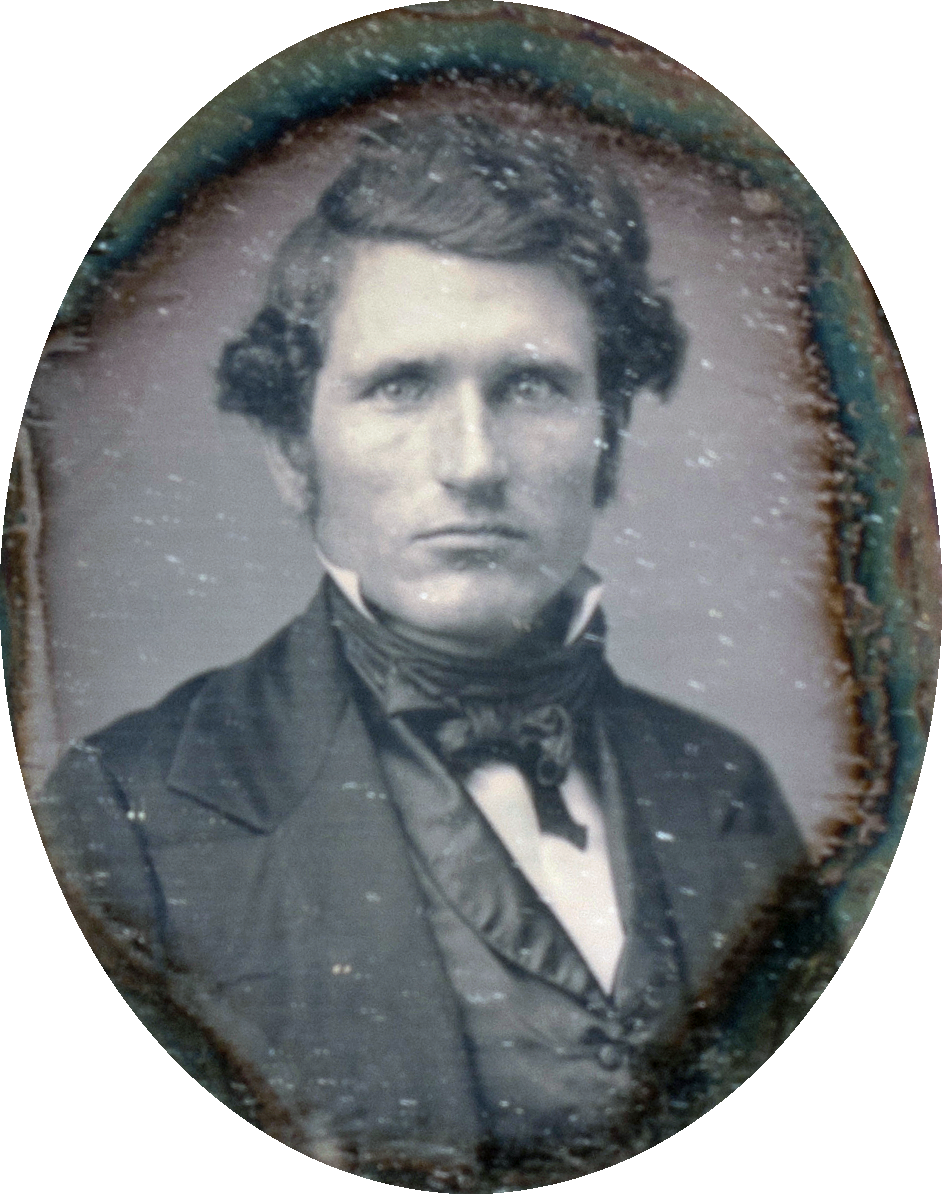
- Lafayette C Baker
- Born: October 13, 1826; Stafford, New York, US
- Died: July 3, 1868 (aged 41); Philadelphia, Pennsylvania, US
- Burial place: Forest Hills Cemetery, Philadelphia, Pennsylvania
- Espionage activity
- Allegiance: United States of America
- Service branch: Union Army

Lafayette Curry Baker (October 13, 1826 – July 3, 1868) was a United States investigator and spy, serving the Union Army during the American Civil War and under Presidents Abraham Lincoln and Andrew Johnson.

== Early life ==
Baker was born in Stafford, New York, on October 13, 1826. He became a mechanic, moved to Michigan in 1839, returned to New York in 1848, moved to California in 1853, and was a San Francisco vigilante in 1856. He moved to the District of Columbia in 1861.

== American Civil War ==
Baker's exploits are mainly known through his book A History of the Secret Service which he published in 1867 after his fall from grace. During the early months of the Civil War, he spied for General Winfield Scott on Confederate forces in Virginia. Despite numerous scrapes, he returned to Washington, D.C., with information that Scott evidently thought valuable enough to raise him to the rank of captain. As Provost Marshal of Washington, D.C., from September 12, 1862, to November 7, 1863, Baker ran the National Detective Bureau, also sometimes known as the "National Detective Police Department." He was appointed colonel of 1st D.C. Cavalry, May 5, 1863. According to Glenn Hastedt, "Although his accomplishments were many, Baker operated with little regard for warrants or the constitutional rights of those he pursued. He is also reported to have employed brutal interrogation techniques in order to obtain information."

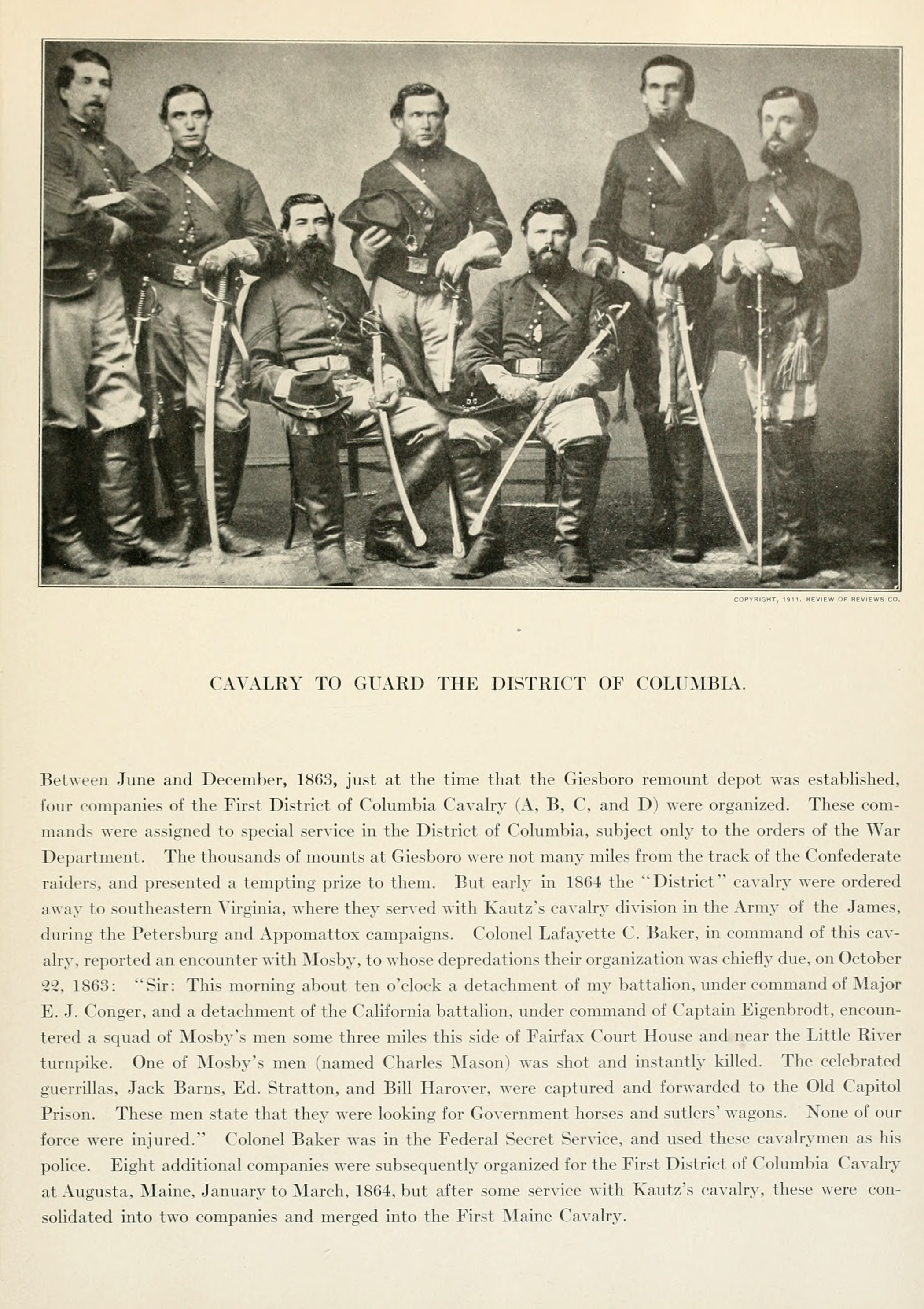
1st D.C Cavalry

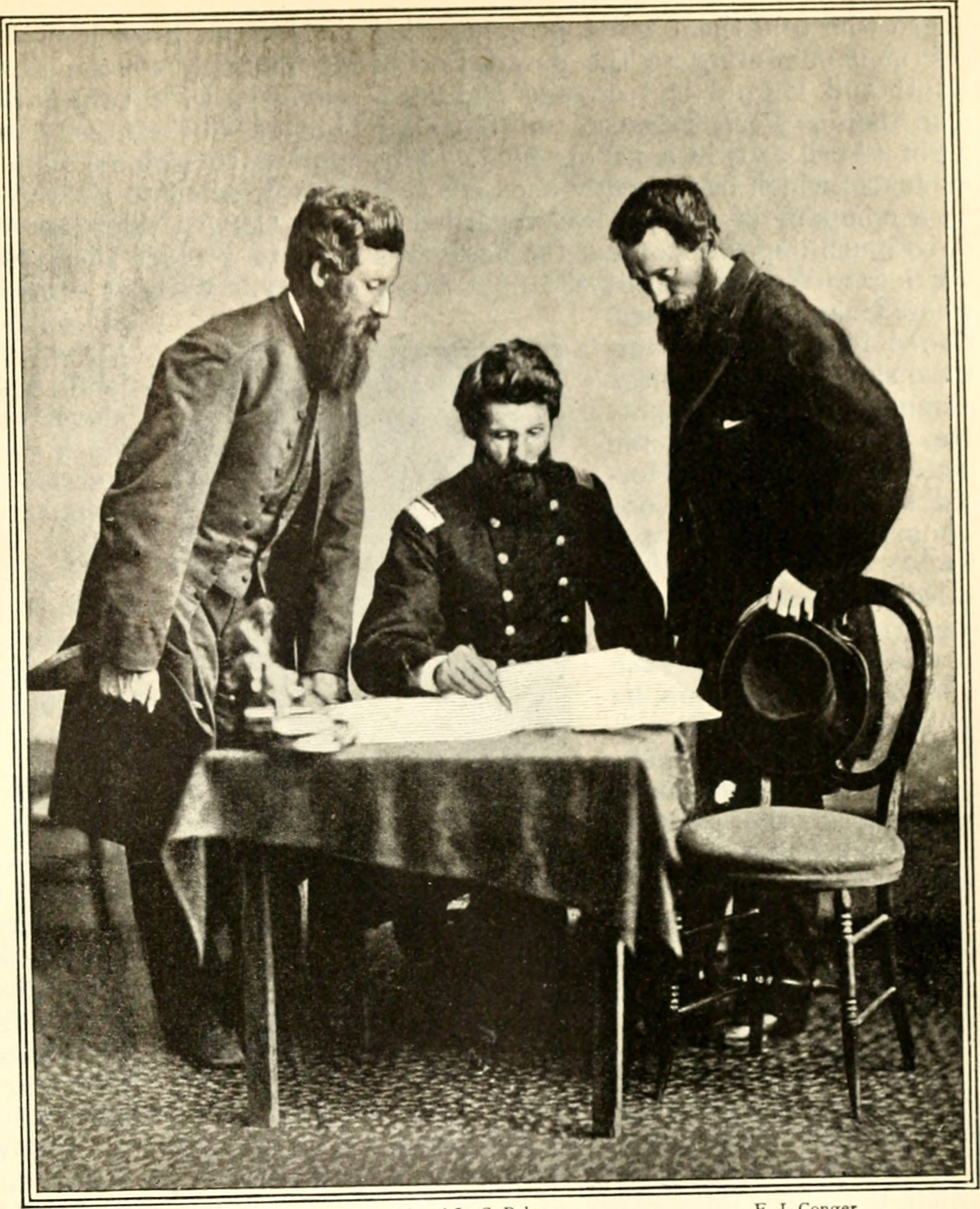
Hq of the Secret Service Bureau, Washington D.C. Lt L B. Baker. Col Lafayetter C Baker and E. J. Conger planning the pursuit of Booth

Baker owed his appointment largely to Secretary of War Edwin M. Stanton, but suspected the secretary of corruption and was eventually demoted for tapping his telegraph lines and packed off to New York.

== Lincoln assassination investigation ==
Baker was recalled to Washington after the assassination of President Lincoln in 1865. Within two days of his arrival in Washington, Baker's agents in Maryland had made four arrests and had the names of two more conspirators, including the actual presidential assassin John Wilkes Booth. Before the month was out, Booth along with David Herold were found holed up in a barn and Booth was himself shot and killed by Sgt. Boston Corbett. Baker received a generous share of the $100,000 reward offered to the person who apprehended the president's killer. President Andrew Johnson nominated Baker for appointment to the grade of brigadier general of volunteers, April 26, 1865, but the United States Senate never confirmed the appointment. Baker was mustered out of the volunteers on January 15, 1866.

== Firing and death ==
The following year, Baker was sacked from his position as government spymaster. President Johnson accused him of spying on him, a charge Baker admitted in his book which he published in response. He also announced that he had had Booth's diary in his possession which was being suppressed by the Department of War and Secretary of War Edwin M. Stanton. When the diary was eventually produced, Baker claimed that eighteen vital pages were missing. It was suggested by Otto Eisenschiml in his book, Why Was Lincoln Murdered?, that these would implicate Stanton in the assassination. However, this notion has been proven as speculation by author Edward Steers Jr. and based on non-reputable sources.

On July 3, 1868, Baker retired to home complaining of soreness from a gun wound during a hunting trip. He had been out drinking with Wally Pollack, his brother-in-law, and came home feeling sick, dying later that night, reportedly from meningitis.

A widely criticized 1977 book, The Lincoln Conspiracy by conspiracy theorists David W. Balsiger and Charles E. Sellier, alleges that Baker was poisoned by high-placed conspirators, including Stanton, who supported John Wilkes Booth's plan to kidnap Abraham Lincoln in 1864 and early 1865. The conspirators supposedly planned to have Lincoln impeached in his absence. The authors speculate that the conspirators were concerned that Baker could link them to the planned kidnapping, which might lead to accusations that they were conspirators in Lincoln's assassination. The authors believe the conspirators did not support Booth after March 1865. Academic historians have treated the book with hostility and derision, having many objections based on errors and misuse of sources in the book.

== Interment ==
Baker is buried in Forest Hills Cemetery, Philadelphia, Pennsylvania.

== In popular culture ==
Baker was portrayed by Patton Oswalt in the 2024 Apple TV+ miniseries series Manhunt.
