= Ron Wyatt =

American creationist (1933–1999)

- Ron Wyatt in 1999
- Born: Ronald Eldon Wyatt; June 2, 1933; Hamilton, Ohio, U.S.
- Died: August 4, 1999 (aged 66); Memphis, Tennessee, U.S.
- Occupation: Nurse anesthetist
- Known for: Claims of discovery of Noah's Ark and other Biblical artifacts

Ronald Eldon Wyatt (June 2, 1933 – August 4, 1999) was an American nurse anesthetist and pseudo-archaeologist best known for claiming to have discovered physical evidence for major events and artifacts described in the Bible. Raised as a Seventh-day Adventist and a biblical literalist in Gatlinburg, Tennessee, Wyatt became interested in biblical archaeology after reading about the alleged Noah's Ark site at Durupınar in 1960.

Beginning in the mid-1970s, Wyatt conducted numerous expeditions throughout the Middle East and announced a series of controversial discoveries. Among his claims were the identification of the Durupınar site as the remains of Noah's Ark, the discovery of the Ark of the Covenant beneath Jerusalem's Garden Tomb, evidence of the Israelites' crossing of the Red Sea, the location of Mount Sinai at Jabal al-Lawz in Saudi Arabia, and the sites of Sodom and Gomorrah near the Dead Sea.

Wyatt's claims attracted widespread attention among evangelical and fundamentalist Christian audiences, making him a popular lecturer and the subject of several documentaries. He established a museum in Tennessee to display materials associated with his investigations and promoted his discoveries through books, videos and lectures.

Although Wyatt developed a substantial following, his conclusions were broadly rejected by professional archaeologists, geologists, historians, biblical scholars, and many creationist writers and researchers. Critics argued that his evidence lacked scientific verification and that many of the features he identified as biblical artifacts or sites were natural geological formations or misinterpreted archaeological remains.

== Life and career ==
Wyatt was born on June 2 1933, and was raised in Gatlinburg, Tennessee as a Seventh-day Adventist. The co-founder of denomination Ellen White believed that the Ark of the Covenant had been secreted away safely in a cave, and would reappear shortly before Jesus's second coming. Wyatt retained a belief in Biblical literalism as an adult.

Wyatt was trained as a nurse anesthetist. He had three children, two sons and a daughter. He was working in a hospital in Madison, Tennessee, when, in 1960, he saw a picture in Life of the Durupınar site, a boat-like shape on a mountain near Mount Ararat. The resulting widespread speculation in evangelical Christian circles that this might be Noah's Ark started Wyatt on his career as an amateur archaeologist. From 1977 onward, he made more than a hundred trips to the Middle East, developing his interests in the Old and New Testaments.

=== Ark of the Covenant ===
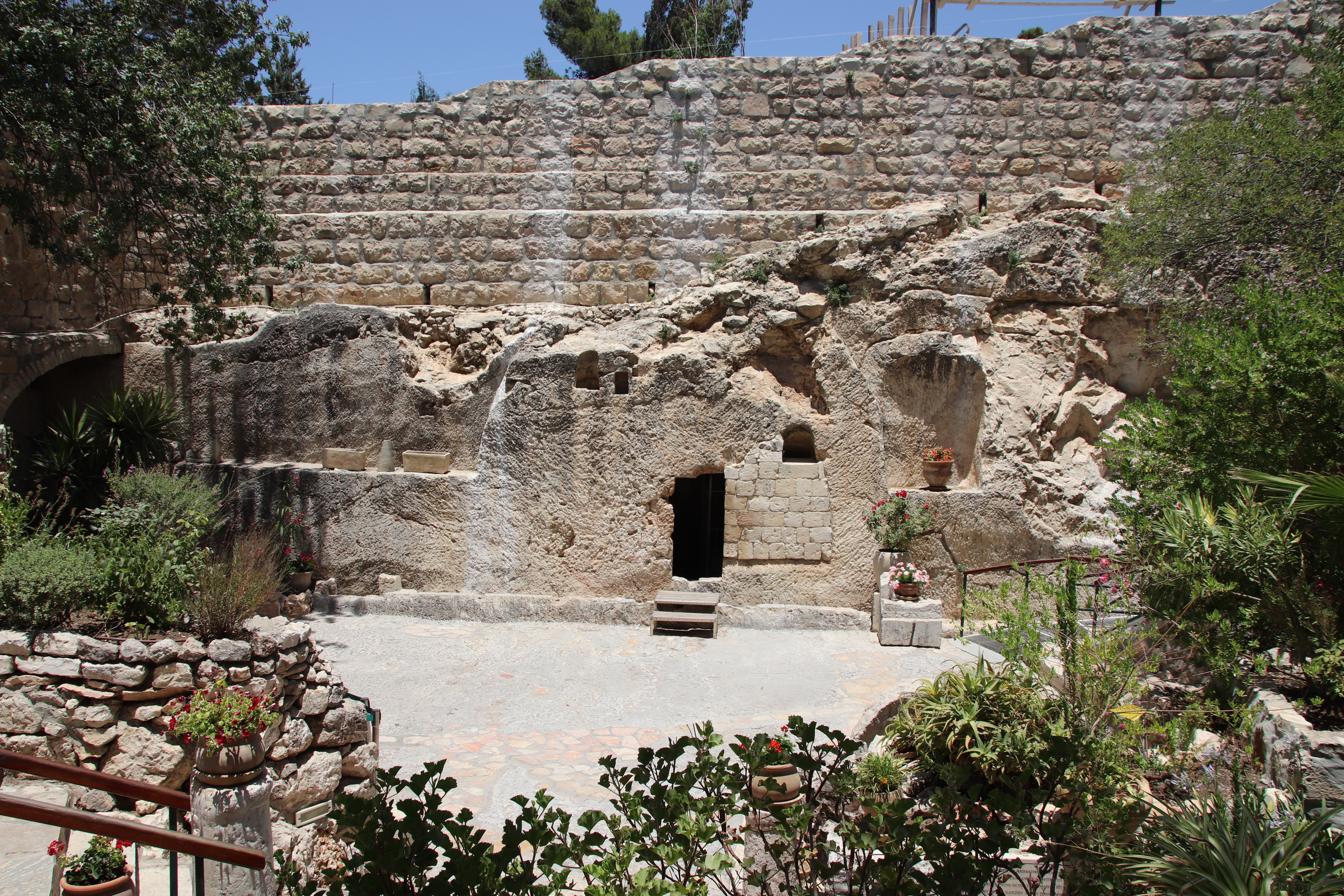
Garden Tomb in Jerusalem

Believing that the Ark of the Covenant was buried in a cave under the Garden Tomb in Jerusalem, in late 1981 and early 1982, Wyatt got permission to dig a shaft in its grounds. Finding a cave system, he claimed to have found rotted timbers, ancient animal skins and a "gold-veneered table", which he recognized as the table of showbread, an artifact from Solomon's Temple. Within the cave he noticed a black substance which appeared to have dribbled on a flat stone that had split in two. He had "the most overwhelming realization" that the black substance was the blood of Christ, and the Ark was under the large stone. He had also noticed a rock hole in the garden above the cave, which he theorized was the site of Jesus' cross. The earthquake mentioned in Matthew's gospel had led to the stone to crack, so that Jesus's blood could reach the Ark of the Covenant in the cave below. He subsequently used a colonoscope to shine a light beneath the split rock; seeing flashes of gold and crown moulding he knew he had seen the Ark. Wyatt also claimed to have seen multiple other religious objects, as well as to have seen the stone tablets with the ten commandments, and legible scrolls within the Ark. Due to the small space, he said he could not remove any of these objects; however, he took samples of the black substance and took some fuzzy polaroid pictures before he sealed up the chamber. He reported that he had found the Ark of the Covenant to Dan Bahat, an archeologist working for the Israel Department of Antiquities and Museums. Bahat reported that Wyatt took him to a pit, and asked him if he saw the box. Bahat saw nothing and instead observed that it was simply a hole where the gardeners dumped their garbage. Wyatt, however, claimed that Bahat had been pressured to keep the discovery secret in order to preserve public order. Wyatt returned later with professional archeologists, but by that time the chamber had collapsed. Wyatt claimed that the black substance had proved to be human blood with twenty four chromosomes rather than the usual 46: 23 chromosomes from Mary and one chromosome from God. As his fame grew, Israeli officials became increasingly annoyed at Wyatt's claims that his Garden tomb excavations had been done with their approval, and that they were forcing him to keep silent about his finds. Joe Zias, the former Curator of Archaeology and Anthropology for the Israel Antiquities Authority reported that he was asked to look into Wyatt's claims by three American pastors who were concerned that money was being siphoned away from local community projects into his organization. Zias contacted Wyatt asking for a copy of the DNA lab report, and for a sample of the blood to replicate the test. Wyatt did not respond except reportedly to refuse to speak to Zias because he was an "infidel". After Wyatt's death, the Wyatt Archaeological Research and the Biblical Archaeology Foundation funded a trial excavation of the caves under Garden Tomb in 2005 led by archeologist Yehiel Zelinger. The findings indicated that the site was originally a quarry and then later a building from the Roman period. Finds included glass, ceramics and a cylinder seal from the Iron Age and the Hellenistic–Byzantine periods. Richard Rives, president of Wyatt Archaeological Research acknowledged issues with the Wyatt's claims given the lack evidence and of witnesses, and because the "recent exploration reveals unexplained discrepancies in that account".

Released in 2006 after his death, a documentary "Testimony of the Ark", directed by Rebecca Truraiaire was made about Wyatt and his work, and in particular his claims about the Ark of the Covenant.

=== Noah's Ark ===
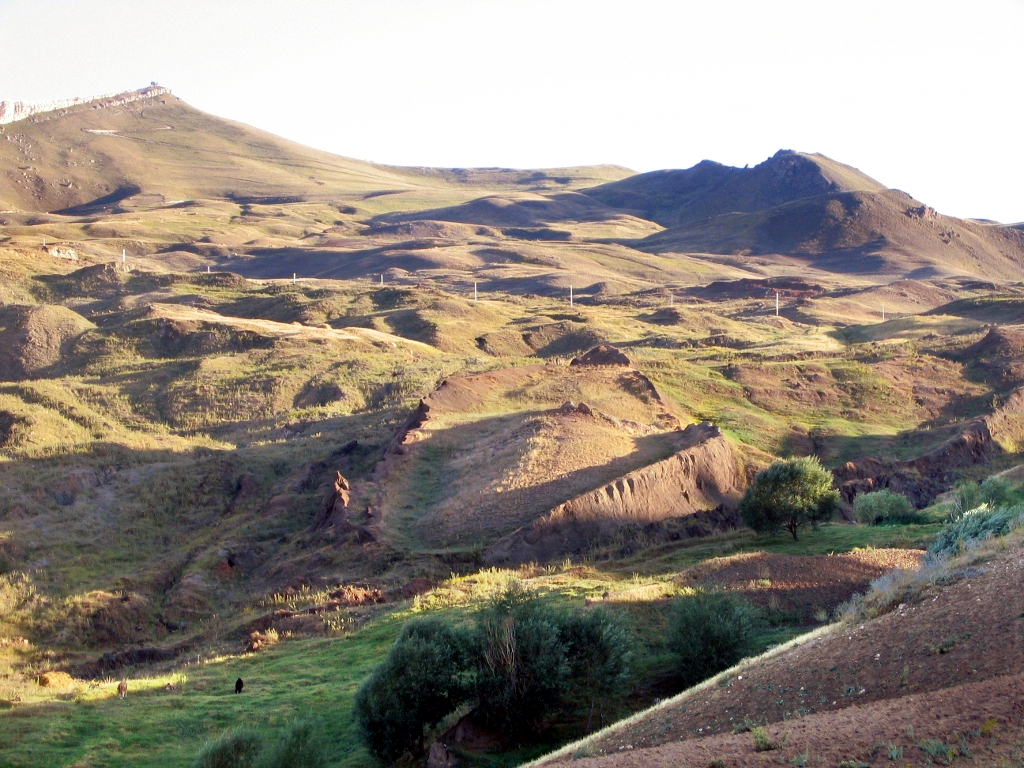
The Durupınar site in 2007

From 1977 onwards, Wyatt went to Durupinar to study the site, including tracing the supposed walls of Noah's Ark. He claimed that the unusual rock found at the site was the petrified Gopher wood of the Ark. He reported that the petrified wood did not have any rings, as trees did not have them until after the flood. Wyatt used what he termed a molecular frequency generator, similar to a dowsing rod, and with it detected striations of metal that he said corresponded with the crossbeams of the boat. Wyatt reported he had found rusted iron brackets from the Ark using a metal detector, a rectangular black "wood beam", as well as so-called anchor stones. Wyatt had various samples, including the beam, analyzed at the Galbraith Laboratory in Knoxville, Tennessee. According to Wyatt the results indicated the beam was made of "plywood". Wyatt stated that metal components were composed of iron, magnesium, manganese, aluminum and titanium, and that Noah had divinely been given the knowledge to forge these alloys when he made the Ark. In 1991, Wyatt and three companions were taken hostage by a Kurdish separatist group. They were released after three weeks and did not return to the site again.

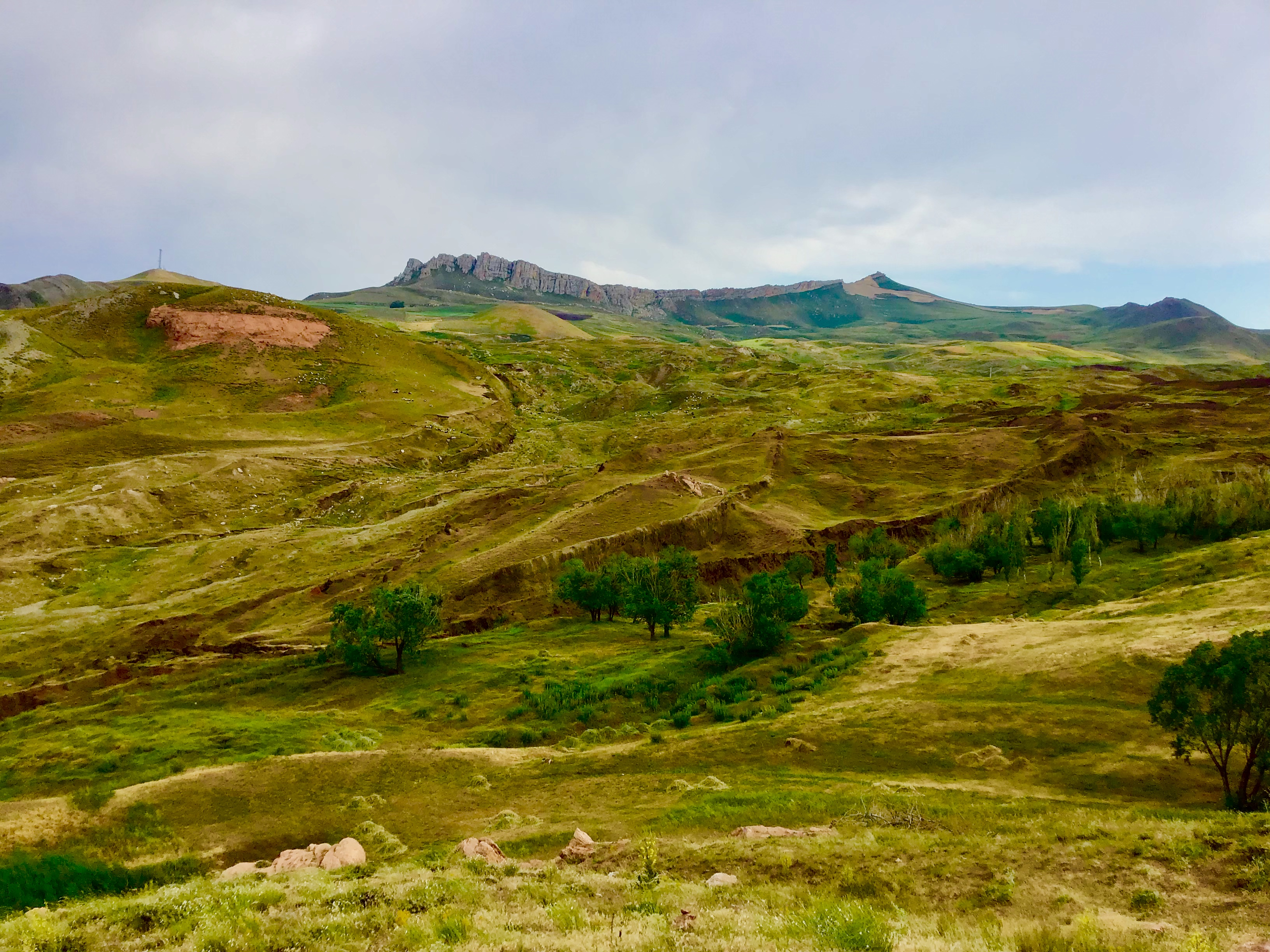
The Durupınar site, Na'hum Gemisi, in 2019

Geologist Lorence G. Collins investigated the claims and noted that the so-called Ark were all part of a natural rock formation. He received samples from the site from David Fasold, an Ark researcher who had begun to entertain doubts. Collins tested the samples and found that the "petrified wood" was all either basalt or andesite volcanic rock. He noted that the Galbraith Laboratory which had tested some rock samples for Wyatt did not typically work with geologic samples, and that Wyatt had misunderstood their reports when he made claims about metal content and the making of alloys. Fellow Seventh Day Adventists, biblical archeologist David Merling and Armenian scholar Abraham Terian, argued that the "anchor stones" were likely pagan stelae. John D. Morris of the Institute for Creation Research who has a doctorate in geological engineering, made two surveys of the site and concluded that it was geologically explainable. He disagreed with Wyatt's notion that trees did not have rings before the flood, and pointed out that the area is rich in manganese nodules which have a high iron content and so could be misidentified as metal objects. He also criticized Wyatt for his use of the molecular frequency generator, arguing that it was akin to "divination—a practice thoroughly condemned by Scripture". Creationist and geologist Andrew Snelling criticized Wyatt for using tools "advertised in treasure-hunting magazines, not scientific journals". John Baumgardner, a creationist and geophysicist tried, and failed, to replicate the finding of metal striation patterns by the molecular frequency generator using a conventional metal detector.

=== Red Sea Crossing ===
In 1978, at the Gulf of Aqaba in the Red Sea, Wyatt stated that while scuba diving in the Red Sea, he discovered the remains of gold-veneered chariot wheels, a horse's hoof, and the remains of Pharaoh's soldiers. No independent testing of the chariots or human bones was ever completed.

=== Mount Sinai ===
In 1984, Wyatt claimed to have located Mount Sinai and the Golden Calf Altar, at Jabal al-Lawsz in Saudi Arabia. He walked across the border from Jordan into Saudi Arabia with his two sons, with the goal of finding treasure taken by the Hebrews when they escaped from Egypt. They explored the site and were captured, spending 78 days in a Saudi jail. In April 1985, he and David Fasold returned to Saudi Arabia legally with the help of Samran al-Motairy with the ostensible goal of finding "commercial minerals", although the treasure remained the main focus. Fasold was to use the molecular frequency generator (MFG) to help find the "gold of Exodus".

=== Sodom and Gomorrah ===
In 1989 and 1990, Wyatt claimed to have discovered Sodom and Gomorrah near the site of Masada in Israel. He stated that he had seen "formations" that looked like burned buildings and city walls, as well as "round balls of encapsulated sulfur (brimstone). In 1992, Wyatt released a video of his work entitled "Discovered: Sodom and Gomorrah! A Video".

Ohio University geology professor Elizabeth Gierlowski-Kordesch reviewed the video and characterized it as junk science. She stated that Wyatt's reported cities are in fact lake sediments accumulated when the Dead Sea was deeper and bigger and the results of seismic activity and erosion. The round balls of sulfur are a common feature of ancient lakes, and consist of the organic remains of animals and portions of surrounding sediment. According to Creation Ministries International, one of Wyatt's colleagues from the alleged Sodom and Gomorrah site sent samples of "ash from buildings" to them. When they were tested at an Australian lab, the report suggested that the sample was not consistent with an ancient fire, but was in fact gypsum-type minerals.

== Final years ==
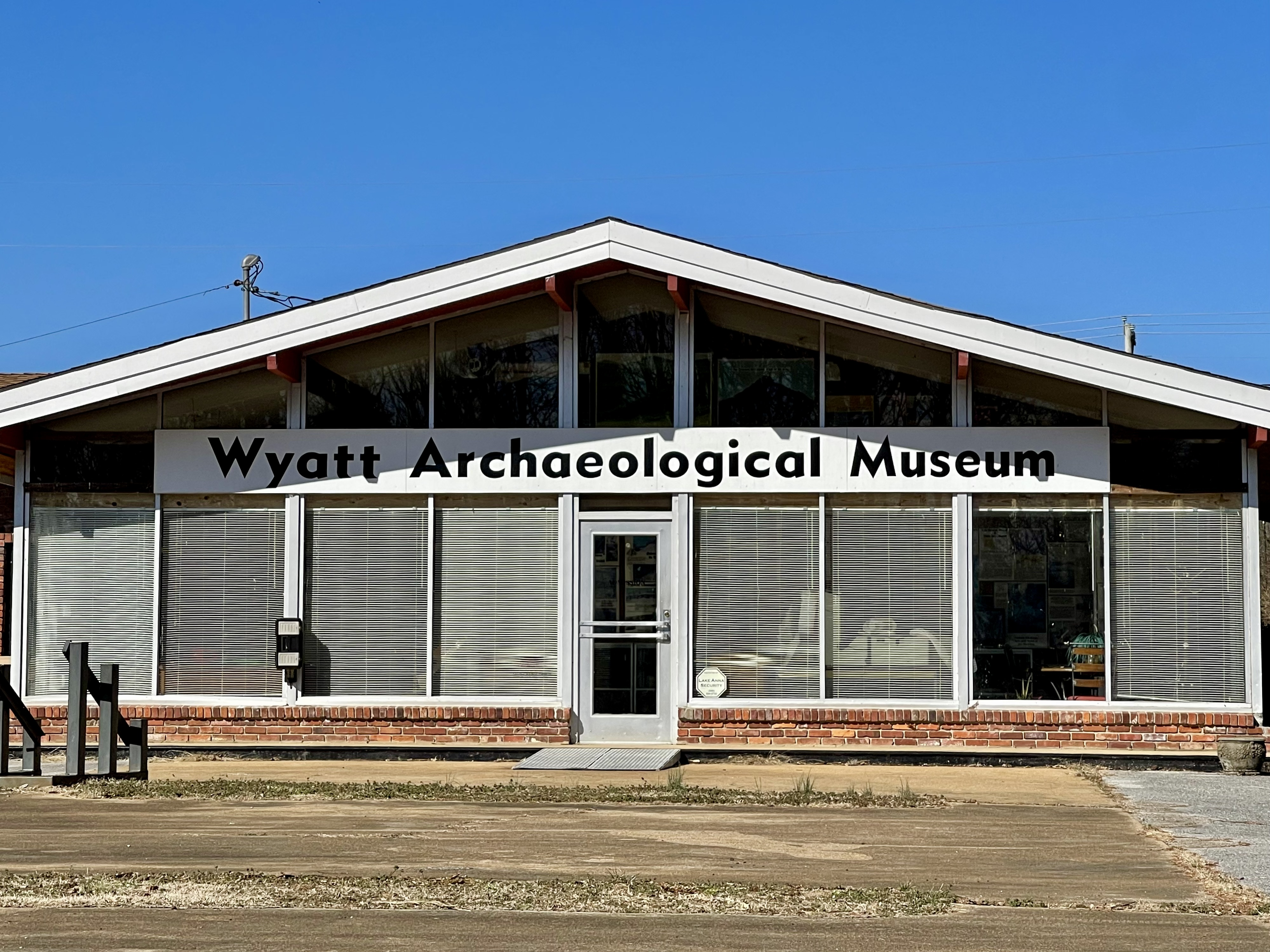
Wyatt Archaeological Museum, in Cornersville, Tennessee

Wyatt opened a museum in Gatlinburg, Tennessee in 1994. The Museum of God's Treasures contained "the discoveries of Noah's Ark, Sodom and Gomorrah, Red Sea crossing, Mt. Sinai, etc.," and a model of the Garden Tomb and the fissure to the cave below.

By 1996, the Gatlinburg museum had closed, and in 1997 Wyatt opened the Wyatt Archeological Museum in Cornersville, Tennessee.

Wyatt died of bone cancer, on August 4, 1999, aged 66, at the Baptist Memorial Hospital in Memphis, Tennessee. He was buried in Polk Memorial Park Cemetery, in Columbia, Tennessee.

== Reception ==
Wyatt's discoveries frequently made the international news. Wyatt became well-known among fundamentalist Christians in North America, New Zealand and Australia, and was a sought-after speaker.

Wyatt's work has been broadly discredited by historians, archeologists and geologists. Archeologists, biblical scholars and fellow creationists and Seventh Day Adventists criticized his claims and his reticence to having the samples scientifically tested, "believing that he was naïve at best and a fraud at worst." Jack Romano wrote in the Fortean Times that Wyatt "invariably managed to ensure that things fitted tidily with Biblical accounts, to the extent that one wonders whether this evidence was fabricated; or was the self-delusion of someone who badly wanted things to neatly slot together and fit his own religious convictions." Romano also said "Ron's evidence is usually anecdotal" and full of "misspellings, vaguely relevant biblical quotes, whimsical interpretations of scientific facts, and muzzy photos of various digs.". Geologist Elizabeth Gierlowski-Kordesh concluded that his claims were baseless and accused him of practicing "junk science." However his lack of credentials and his ostracism from academic recognition was seen by some Christian communities as adding to his stature and credibility.

== See also ==
- In Search of Noah's Ark
- Mount Judi
- Mountains of Ararat
- Searches for Noah's Ark

== Sources ==
- Corbin, B. J. (1999). The Explorers of Ararat and the search for Noah's ark. Great Commission Illustrated Books.
- Eedle, Arthur (10 August 1999). "15. Tribute to Ron Wyatt". Prophetic Telegraph.
- Jarriel, Tom (October 17, 1985). 20/20 October 17, 1985. 20/20. ABC News.
- "Letter from Joe Zias". Tentmaker Ministries.
- Longman, Tremper (2009). How to Read Exodus. InterVarsity Press. ISBN 978-0-8308-3858-5.
- Melton, J. Gordon (2008). The Encyclopedia of Religious Phenomena. Visible Ink Press. ISBN 978-1-57859-209-8.
- Mikkelson, David (2013-12-16). "Was Noah's Ark Found by Explorers in Eastern Turkey?". Snopes.
- "Noah's Ark? Boatlike form is seen near Ararat". Life. September 5, 1960. pp. 112–114.
- Qguz, Zeynep (2023). "Geo-Spiritualities of the Flood: Political Geologies of the Great Deluge on the Mountains of Anatolia". In Bashford, Alison; Kern, Emily M.; Bobbette, Adam (eds.). New Earth Histories : Geo-Cosmologies and the Making of the Modern World. University of Chicago Press.
- Wieland, Carl (February 11, 2003). "AiG discussion of Wyatt and other claims with Kent Hovind, October/December 2002". Archived from the original on February 11, 2003.
