= Mount Tendürek =

Shield volcano in eastern Turkey

Tendürek
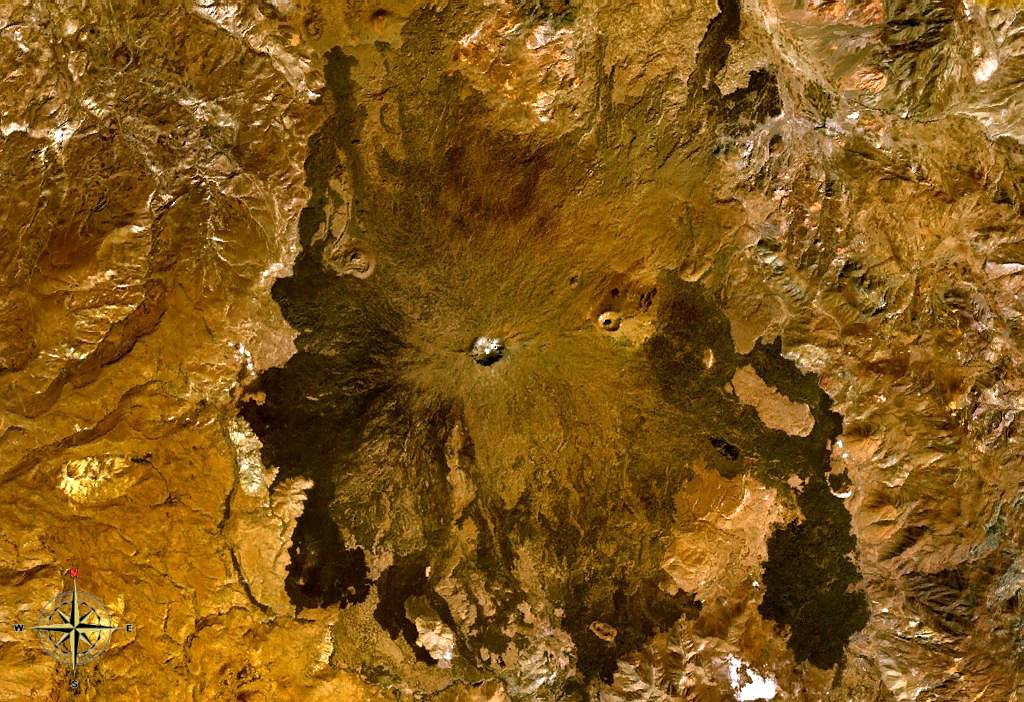
- Tendürek seen from space

Highest point
- Elevation: 3,514 m (11,529 ft)
- Prominence: 1,294 m (4,245 ft)
- Coordinates: 39.37°N 43.87°E

Geography
- Location within Turkey
- Location: Ağrı and Van provinces, Turkey
- Parent range: Armenian Highlands

Geology
- Rock age: 250,000 years
- Mountain type: Shield volcano
- Last eruption: 1855

Mount Tendürek (Turkish: Tendürek Dağı; Armenian: Թոնդրակ, romanized: T’ondrak) is a shield volcano on the border of Ağrı and Van provinces in eastern Turkey, near the border with Iran. The volcano, which is mostly known for being near the supposed wreck site of Noah's Ark, is very large; its lava flows cover roughly 650 km^{2} (251 mi^{2}) across a swath of flat land. The mountain's two main features are the main summit crater Greater Tendürek, and a smaller crater known as Lesser Tendürek which lies to the east of the main crater. The slopes are very gentle and resemble a shield, after which the type is named. Mount Tendürek is known to have erupted viscous lava like that of volcanoes on the island of Hawaii.

The volcano is part of a volcanic group surrounding Lake Van that includes Nemrut Caldera and Mount Ararat. This group of volcanoes formed as a result of a continental collision that began roughly six million years ago and continued for the next few million years. Volcanicity in Tendürek started roughly 250,000 years ago and is still active. The most-recent eruption, a gas-and-ash eruption from the summit crater, occurred in 1855; this is also the most-recent eruption in Turkey. Since then, the volcano has mostly been geothermally active, emitting some steam and gases from the summits. Since 1993, the volcano's magma chamber has been subsiding, meaning the volcano is entering a dormancy phase.

== Geography ==
Map of volcanoes surrounding Lake Van

Mount Tendürek is a shield volcano in far-eastern Turkey, approximately 950 km (590 mi) from the capital Ankara. The volcano is located northeast of Lake Van and roughly 25 km (16 mi) from Doğubeyazıt, which is the largest town in the vicinity. More than 170,000 people live within 30 km (19 mi) of the volcano, making it a potential threat to nearby settlements.

=== Topography ===
At the summit of Tendürek are two craters; the larger western peak has a height of 250 m (820 ft) and a diameter of 1 km (1 mi), and is the volcano's highest point, exceeding 3,500 m (11,483 ft). The eastern peak, which is called Lesser Tendürek (Küçük Tendürek in Turkish), is about 100 m (328 ft) high and has a diameter of 800 m (2,625 ft). The main crater's lava flows engulfed Lesser Tendürek, causing the elevation difference between the craters to decrease.

The western crater has a more prominent relief than the eastern crater; it is funnel-shaped and has a cylindrical trachytic spine in the east rim. The eastern crater is mostly flat and is filled with a warm lake.

Erupted volcanic material from these craters, mostly lava, covers roughly 650 km^{2} (251 mi^{2}). Following the main crater's formation, multiple eruptions along the flanks of the volcano with north–south-directed fissures occurred, forming trachyte domes and pāhoehoe lava flows, a viscous and very mobile lava type. These eruptions, until 2,500 years ago, expanded the area of lava-covered land.

== Tectonic setting ==
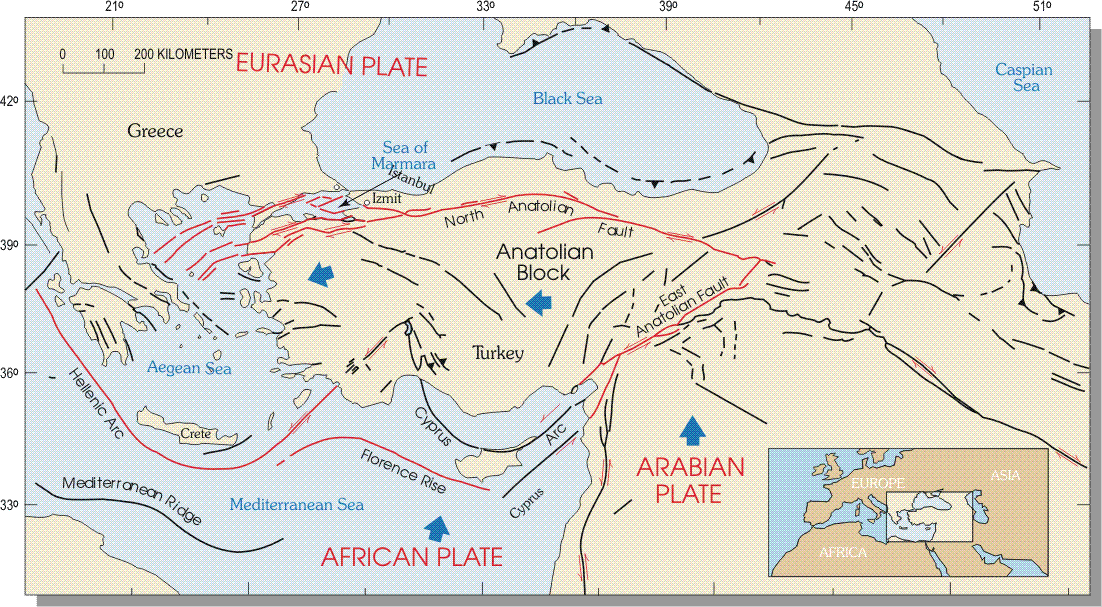
Tectonic map of Turkey

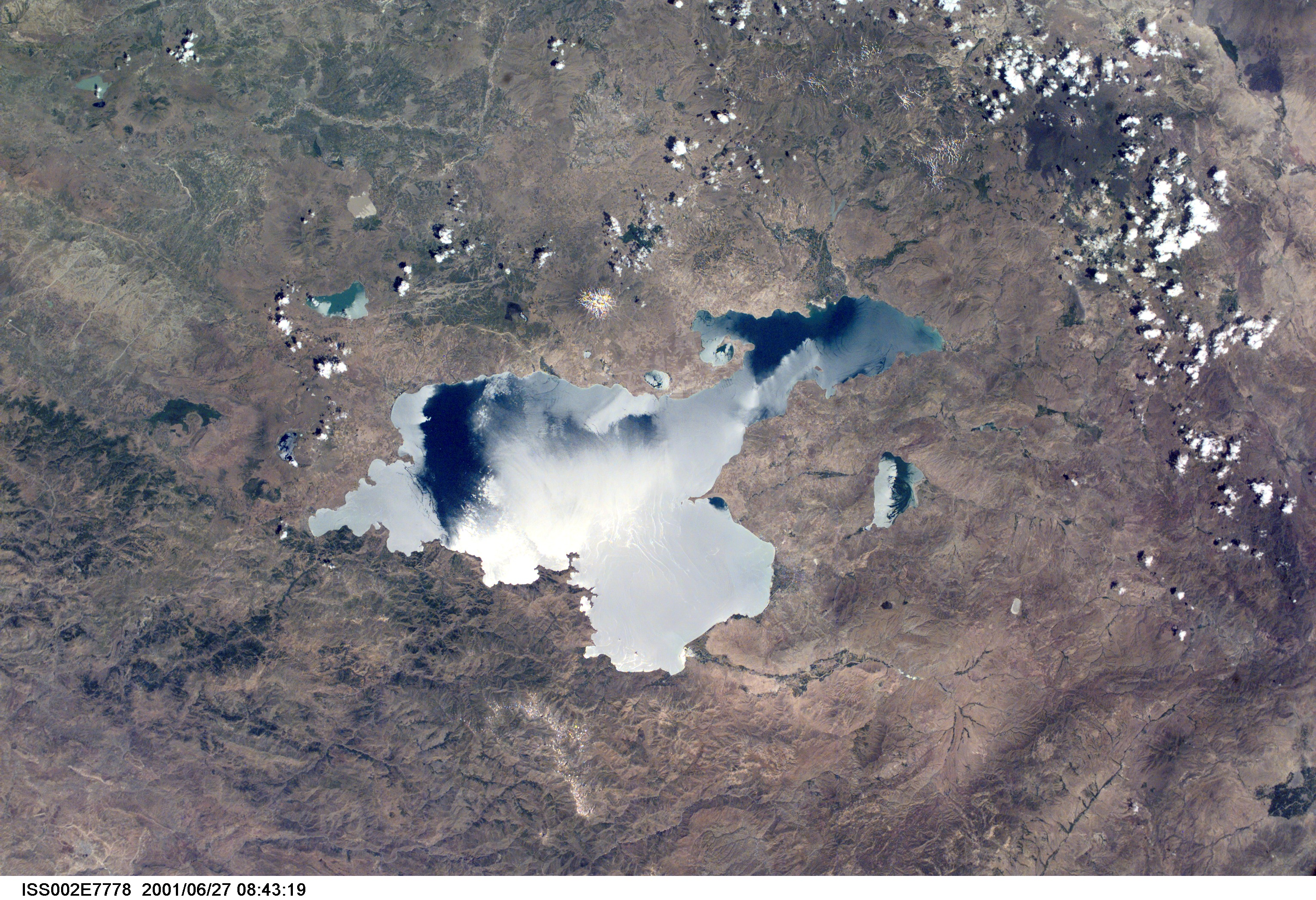
Lake Van viewed from satellite; the darker colored terrain in top right is Tendürek

Tendürek is in Turkey, which has some of the world's most-extensive seismic activity and deformation. The country is known for its extensive history of large and deadly earthquakes and is within the Mediterranean Earthquake Belt, a complex deformation zone caused by the collision between the African and the Eurasian tectonic plates.

The tectonics of Turkey are made up of three main elements: the Aegean-Cyprus Arc, a convergent plate boundary where the African Plate lithosphere subducts under the Anatolian Plate; the dextral strike-slip North Anatolian Fault, where the fault block moves horizontally rightwards against the block across the fault; and the sinistral strike-slip East Anatolian Fault, where the fault block moves horizontally leftwards against the block across the fault. The North and East Anatolian Faults are lengthy, strike-slip faults where the Anatolian Plate crust slides against the Arabian Plate and the Eurasian Plates to move westward from them. These two faults, in their eastern end, meet and form the Karlıova triple junction, a triple strike-slip collision zone.

=== Regional setting ===
The volcanism near Lake Van in Eastern Anatolia is thought to have begun in the late Miocene as a result of continental collision as part of a volcanic province that extends 900 km (559 mi), with a width of 350 km (217 mi), from Syria toward the northeast at the border of Armenia. The earliest collision volcanism in the region is thought to have occurred southwest of Erzurum near Solhan in the middle-late Miocene as northward subduction parallel to the Bitlis Thrust Zone (northwest-southeast directed). This subduction, over the next few million years, resulted in the formation of multiple volcanic centers, including Mount Tendürek.

Mount Tendürek lies between two long dextral strike-slip faults directed northwest–southeast. These faults accommodate the continental collision.

=== Petrology ===
The volcano's lavas are predominant basalts and trachyandesites; these are the typical types for Tendürek. The basic lavas—lavas with a lower silica rate—contain phenocrysts of plagioclase, clinopyroxene and uncommon olivine. The intermediate lavas—lavas with a higher silica rate—contain large, zoned plagioclase (oligoclase-andesine), glomerocrysts of clinopyroxene and magnetite, both in a plagioclase-rich groundmass.

== Eruptive history ==
Since its formation 250 thousand years (ka) ago, Mount Tendürek has had five phases; in phase I (250-200 ka), the first volcanic activity at the location took place with trachybasalts; in phase II (200-150 ka), more volcanic craters and fissures formed with tephrites; in phase III (150-100 ka), the eastern crater Lesser Tendürek began to form and activity centralized on it with phonolites and trachyites; in phase IV (100-70 ka), activity slowed followed by the formation of the western crater Greater Tendürek with trachyandesites; and in phase V (50 ka-present), activity continues with phonolitic summit eruptions.

=== Pre-cone eruptive episodes ===
Volcanic activity at Mount Tendürek began roughly 250,000 years ago with fissure eruptions out of transtensional fault lines. These extrusions produced lava composed of trachybasaltic magma like hawaiite and tephritic pyroclastic flows with deposits. These pyroclastic materials were deposited above non-volcanic rocks that form the base of the Tendürek volcano. This primary extrusion was followed by a series of explosive tephrite eruptions accommodated by viscous trachybasaltic lava. During the pre-cone activity period, domes and clusters of cinder cones formed on north–south-trending fissures of the volcano. Erupted mobile tephrite and basalt lava from these cinder cones covered 1,000 km^{2} (386 mi^{2}) on the Doğubayazıt and Çaldıran plains. These lava flows remain under younger alluvial deposits. This period lasted roughly 100,000 years.

=== First main cone formation ===
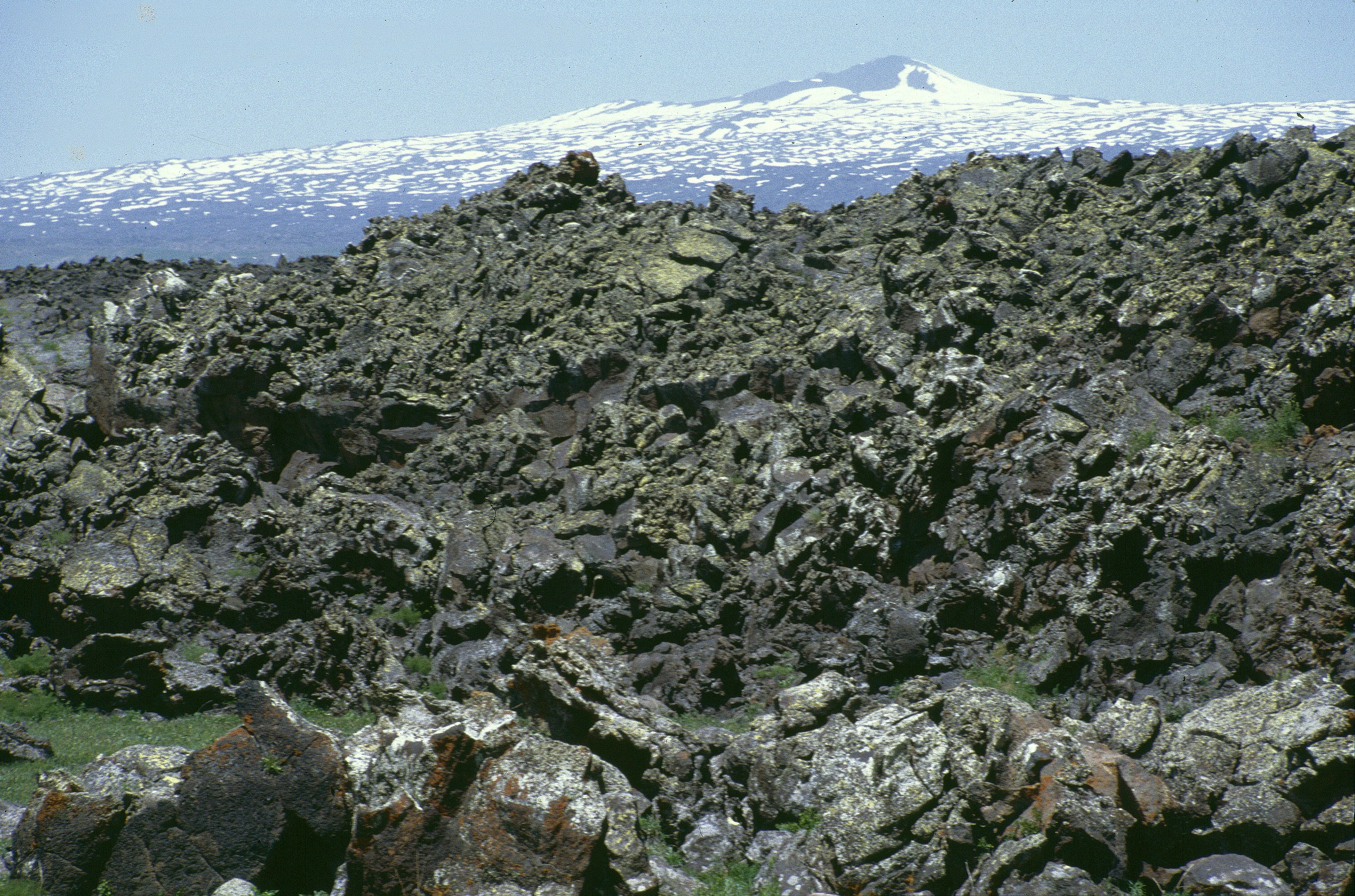
Lava flows with Lesser Tendürek in the background

150,000 years ago, immediately before the cone-building phase started, volcanic activity at Mount Tendürek shifted to one central spot, where it remains. Later, a new cone—the eastern crater Lesser Tendürek—started erupting trachytic and benmoreite lava flows that spread equally along the plain on which the cone was located. Following these, very thin basaltic lavas erupted and later spread widely and smoothly, carpeting the area. This first episode of cone-building activity concluded with more effusive eruptions, varying from trachytic to basaltic lavas that formed a radial flank to this central cone with shallow angles of between 20 and 40 degrees. This flank, which followed by subsequent eruptions, expanded with more-fluid and thinner lava flows of the same variety. After this phase, a period of quiescence took place.

In a later period, another new trachytic eruption began following the eruption of the second main cone. When the erupting lava flows decreased, newly ejected lava in the first main cone blocked its crater, pausing the first main cone's summit eruptions. This caused pressure on the cone to increase. Because the crater of this cone was blocked, an internal collapse may have occurred in the volcano's structure, causing faults and fractures trending circularly to form in the flanks close to the summit of the complex. These faults cut through the then-newly formed volcanic rocks.

=== Second main cone formation ===
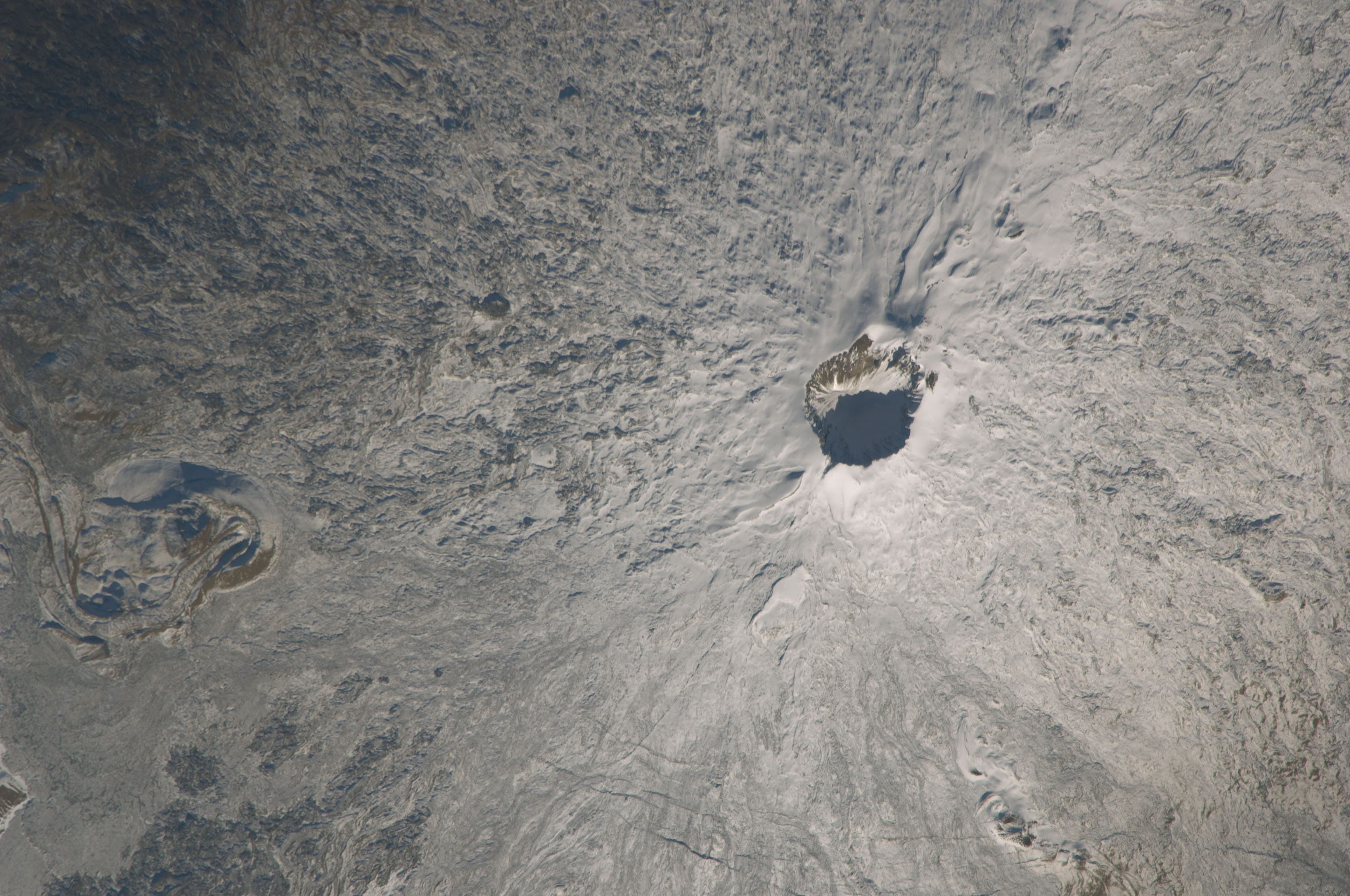
Greater Tendürek viewed from the ISS, spatter cone in the left of image. Looking northeastward.

The climactic phase of the volcano began when activity shifted to a new cone—the western crater of Greater Tendürek— between 100,000 and 70,000 years ago. This new cone began erupting voluminous and fast-moving trachyte and benmoreite lava flows that reached a thickness of 250 m (820 ft). These large lava flows formed the current topographic profile of the volcano and expanded more than 500 km^{2} (193 mi^{2}) along the basement of the volcano.

In the summit crater, as a result of the pressure blocking the main eastern crater, fractures and faults formed in the southern wall of the crater, and filled with magma that formed very thin dikes. Meanwhile, the crater's northwestern wall is slightly deformed outward of the crater as a result of forced lava injection into the caldera. The former peak of the volcano along the crater walls is thought to have collapsed as a result of an avalanche caused by an eruption that formed a smaller, breached crater. The most-recent eruption in 1855 occurred in the summit crater, forming a small, steep-sided cone.

=== Flank eruptions ===
At the same time as the summit eruptions, some of the underground magma found a different way to the surface, resulting in flank eruptions that took place far from the main craters in areas with no lava cover. These usually erupted from north–south-directed fissures and later formed into a cinder cone. Lava from these eruptions mostly flowed 200 m (656 ft) to 500 m (1,640 ft) wide, and were usually 2 m (7 ft) to 4 m (13 ft) tall. These flank extrusions were usually of basaltic-trachytic characteristics. The most-recent of these extrusions took place roughly 2,500 years ago in the southeast of the volcano.

=== Recent dormancy ===
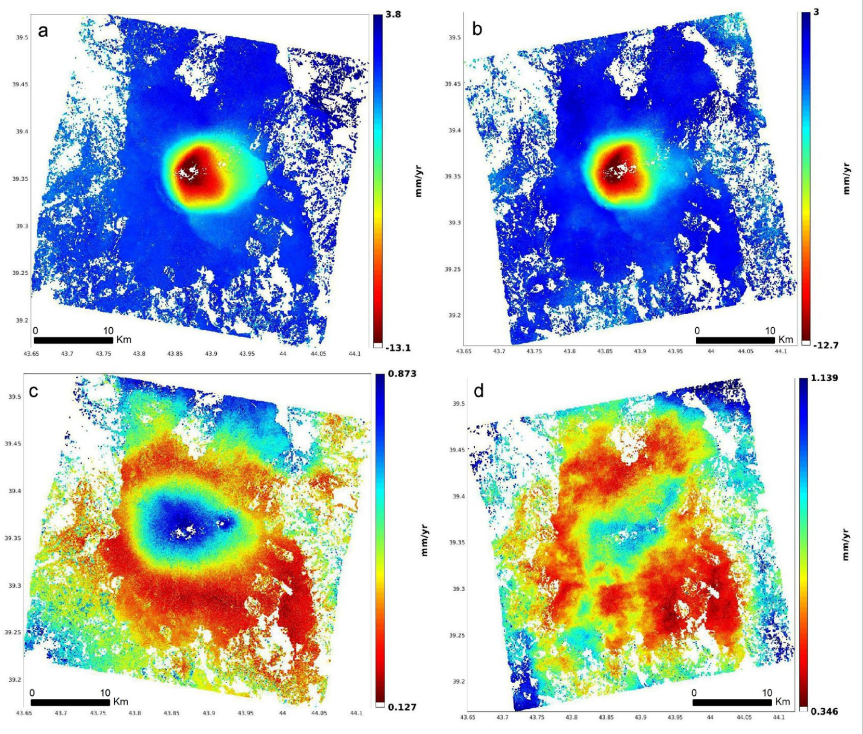
Map of deformation at Tendürek between May 2018-October 2022.

Since its last eruption, Mount Tendürek has continued to be geothermally active. Steam and gas emissions can be seen in both craters, and on the flanks. The summit region of Tendürek has been subsiding since 1993 as the result of a sill contracting at a depth of 4.5 km (3 mi), indicating upcoming dormancy. In 2013, the sill had dimensions of about 6 km (4 mi) x 7 km (4 mi), and is continuing to decrease in volume as it continues to solidify. The contraction of the sill causes a subsidence of about 11 mm (0.43 in) per year at the summit as measured by InSAR. The subsidence has reactivated the ring faults around the summits.

== Flora and fauna ==
The Tendürek region is home to endemic plant species including Fritillaria michailovskyi, Centaurea demirizii, Campanula coriacea and Calamintha caroli-henricana. Bird populations in the region include European roller, European nightjar, ortolan bunting and lesser grey shrike. The steppe eagle is thought to be present in this area, but there is no exact data.

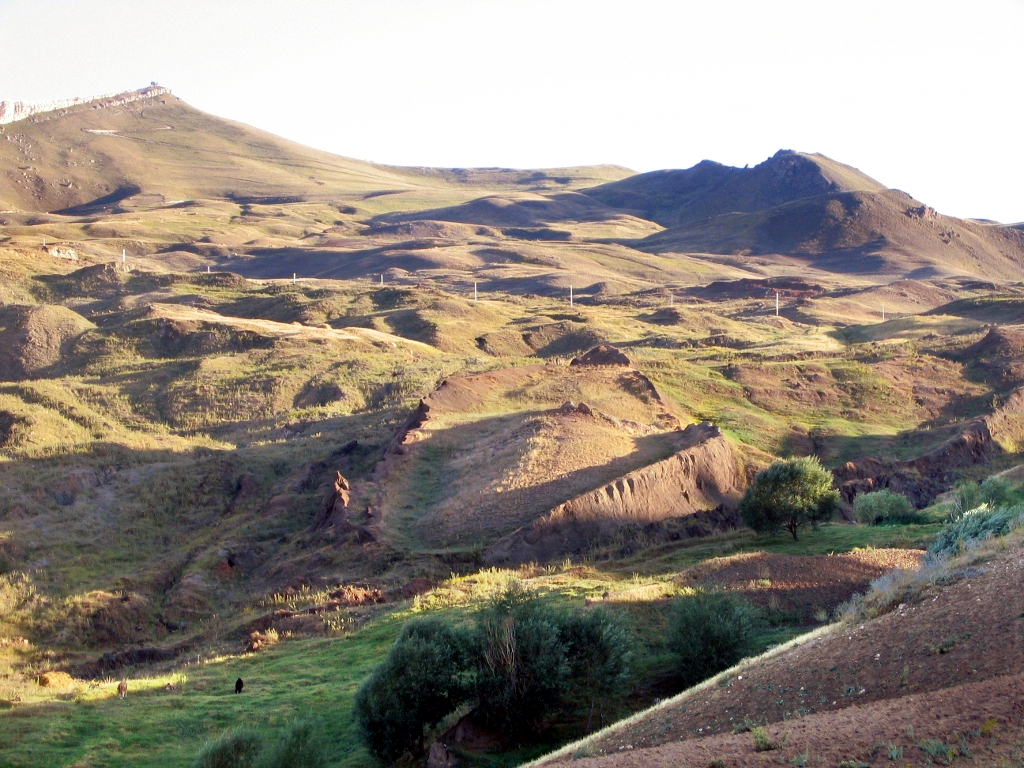
The Durupınar site, which has been linked to Noah's Ark.

== In culture ==
East of Mount Tendürek is the Durupınar site, which due to its size, ship-like shape and big aggregate structure is considered by some, without evidence, to be the remains of Noah's Ark.

Medieval Armenian Tondrakians, a religious movement of the 950s, is named after this area. The Tondrakians were a heretical movement who opposed the Armenian Church in the Byzantine Empire.

== See also ==
- Armenian highlands
- List of volcanoes in Turkey
- Flood geology
- Flood myth
- Mountains of Ararat
  - Mount Ararat
    - Ararat anomaly
- Zagros Mountains
  - Mount Judi

== Sources ==
- Lebedev, V. A.; Sharkov, E. V.; Ünal, E.; Keskin, M. (2016). "Late Pleistocene Tendürek Volcano (Eastern Anatolia, Turkey): I. Geochronology and petrographic characteristics of igneous rocks". Petrology. 24 (2): 127–152. doi:10.1134/S0869591116020041. S2CID 131205904.
- Yılmaz, Y.; Güner, Y.; Şaroğlu, F. (1998). "Geology of the quaternary volcanic centres of the east Anatolia". Journal of Volcanology and Geothermal Research. 85 (1–4): 173–210. Bibcode:1998JVGR...85..173Y. doi:10.1016/S0377-0273(98)00055-9.
- Bozkurt, E. (2001). "Neotectonics of Turkey – a synthesis". Geodinamica Acta. 14 (1–3): 3–30. doi:10.1080/09853111.2001.11432432. S2CID 129718202.
- Pearce, J. A.; Bender, J. F.; De Long, S. E.; Kidd, W. S. F.; Low, P. J; Güner, Y.; Şaroğlu, F.; Yılmaz, Y.; Moorbath, S.; Mitchell, J. G. (1990). "Genesis of collision volcanism in Eastern Anatolia, Turkey". Journal of Volcanology and Geothermal Research. 44 (1–2): 189–229. Bibcode:1990JVGR...44..189P. doi:10.1016/0377-0273(90)90018-B.
- Bathke, H.; Nikkhoo, M.; Holohan, E. P.; Walter, T. R. (2015). "Insights into the 3D architecture of an active caldera ring-fault at Tendürek volcano through modeling of geodetic data". Earth and Planetary Science Letters. 422: 157–168. Bibcode:2015E&PSL.422..157B. doi:10.1016/j.epsl.2015.03.041. hdl:10754/579155.
- Gündüz, H. I.; Yılmaztürk, F.; Orhan, O. (2023). "An Investigation of Volcanic Ground Deformation Using InSAR Observations at Tendürek Volcano (Turkey)". Applied Sciences. 13 (11): 0–15. doi:10.3390/app13116787.
- Bathke, H.; Sudhaus, H.; Holohan, E. P.; Walter, T. R.; Shirzaei, M. (2013). "An active ring fault detected at Tendürek volcano by using InSAR". Journal of Geophysical Research: Solid Earth. 118 (8): 4488–4502. Bibcode:2013JGRB..118.4488B. doi:10.1002/jgrb.50305. S2CID 129673735.
