= Ararat anomaly =

Alleged structure seen in photos of Mount Ararat

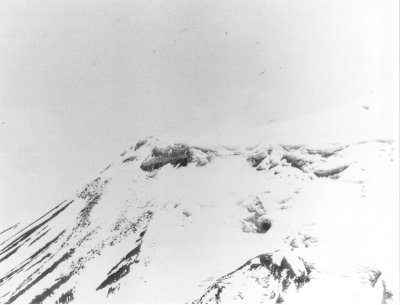
Picture of the Ararat anomaly taken by the U.S. Department of Defense in 1949

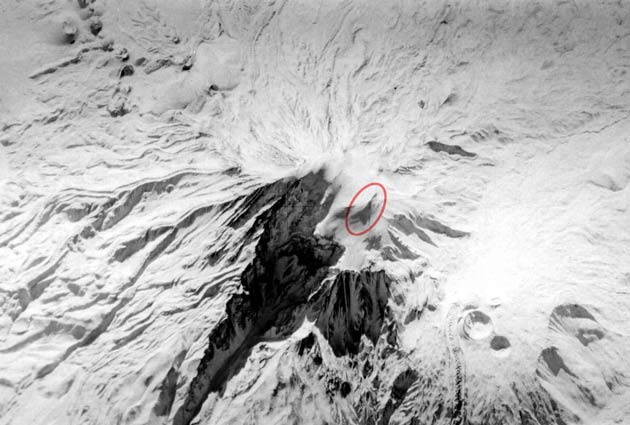
1973 Keyhole-9 image with Ararat anomaly circled in red

The Ararat anomaly is an alleged structure appearing on photographs of the snowfields near the summit of Mount Ararat, Turkey, and advanced by some Christian believers as the remains of Noah's Ark.

== Location ==
The anomaly is located on the northwest corner of the Western Plateau of Mount Ararat (approximately 39°42′40″N 44°17′59″E) at about 15,500 ft (4,724 m), some 2.2 km (1.4 mi) west of the 16,854 ft (5,137 m) summit, on the edge of what appears from the photographs to be a steep downward slope.

== History of existing imagery ==
It was first filmed during a U.S. Air Force aerial reconnaissance mission in 1949 - the Ararat massif sits on the former Turkish / Soviet border, and was thus an area of military interest - and was accordingly given a classification of "secret" as were subsequent photographs taken in 1956, 1973, 1976, 1990, and 1992, by aircraft and satellites.

Six frames from the 1949 footage were released under the Freedom of Information Act to Porcher Taylor, a professor at the University of Richmond in Virginia, and a scholar at the Washington-based Center for Strategic and International Studies specializing in satellite intelligence and diplomacy, in 1995.

A joint research project was later established between Insight Magazine and Space Imaging (now GeoEye), using the IKONOS satellite. IKONOS captured the anomaly on 5 August and 13 September 2000. GeoEye has constructed a computerized video of the imagery it captured of the anomaly. The structure appears at approximately halfway through the video. A controversial "bird's eye view" satellite image, taken by IKONOS later in 2003 for the same research project, was released to the public in 2006.

The Mount Ararat area also has been imaged by France's SPOT satellite in September 1989, Landsat in the 1970s and NASA's Space Shuttle in 1994, as well as military satellite images captured by the CIA's KH-9 (Keyhole 9) in 1973 and KH-11 (Keyhole 11) in 1976 and 1990–1992.

== See also ==
- Creationism
- Durupınar site
- David Fasold
- Deluge (mythology)
- Flood geology
- Gilgamesh flood myth
- Pareidolia
- Searches for Noah's Ark
