= Mount Judi =

Mountain in Turkey

- ٱلْجُودِيّ (Arabic); Çiyayê Cûdîyê (Kurdish); Cudi Dağı (Turkish)
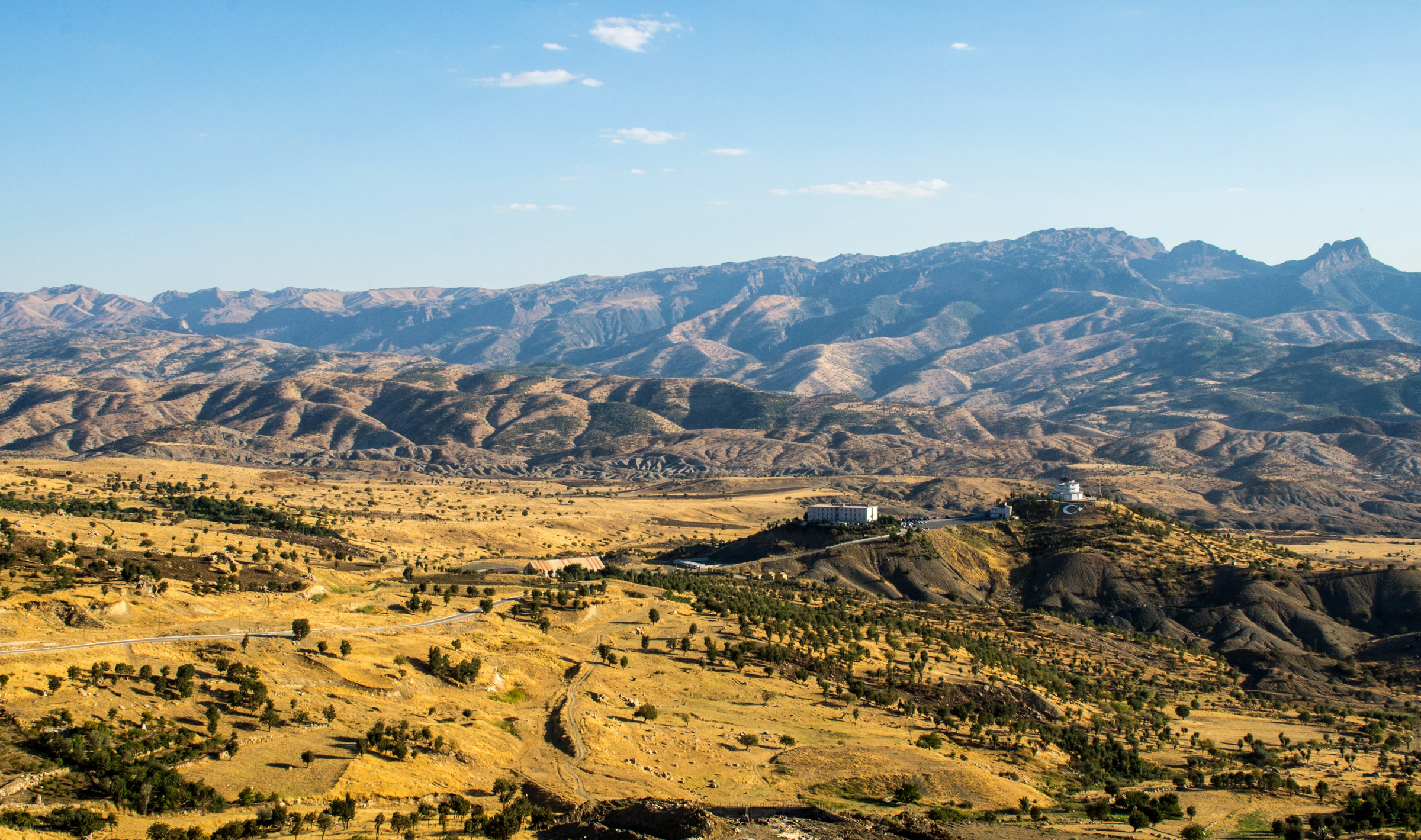
- The mountain range, as seen from Şırnak in eastern Turkey

Highest point
- Elevation: 2,089 m (6,854 ft)
- Coordinates: 37°22′10″N 42°20′39″E

Geography
- Location within Turkey Location within Middle East Location within West and Central Asia
- Location: Şırnak, Turkey
- Parent range: Armenian / Taurus / Zagros Mountains

Mount Judi (Turkish: Cudi Dağı; Arabic: ٱلْجُودِيّ, romanized: Al-Jūdiyy; Armenian: Արարադ; Kurdish: Çiyayê Cûdîyê) is a mountain in Turkey. It was considered in antiquity to be Noah's apobaterion or "Place of Descent", the location where the Ark came to rest after the Great Flood, according to very early Christian and Islamic traditions (the latter based on the Quran, 11:44). The Quranic tradition is part of the Judeo-Christian-Islamic belief. The identification of biblical Ararat with Mount Judi as the landing site of the ark persisted in Syriac and Armenian tradition throughout Late Antiquity. Only during the Middle Ages was this identification abandoned in favour of another mountain, which had not until then been referred to by any of the native peoples as Mount Ararat (a double-peaked massif, today the highest mountain in Turkey and now generally known by that name).

== Location ==
Mount Judi is situated in Turkey's Şırnak Province, near the villages of Derebaşı and Boyunyaka, at latitude: 37°22'28.21" and longitude: 42°28'16.03".

It is a peak northeast of the town of Cizre in south-east Turkey, at the headwaters of the Tigris River, near the modern border with Syria and that of Iraq. A 10th-century historian placed it c. 32 miles (51 km)) from the Tigris.

== Etymology and historical discussion ==
The mountainous area that Mount Judi is part of, was known as Qardū (Syriac: ܩܪܕܘ) in Syriac texts, Gordyene by Greek and Roman writers, and Kordukh in Armenian.

Syriac, Islamic, and early Christian traditions identify Mount Judi or Qardu as a peak near or northeast of the town of Jazirat ibn 'Umar in (modern Cizre) Upper Mesopotamia, at the headwaters of the Tigris River. Arab historian Al-Masudi (d. 956), reported that the spot where the ark came to rest could be seen in his time, and that it was located at 80 parasangs (approximately 32 miles (51 km)) from the Tigris. The mountain was historically located in the province of Corduene, south of Lake Van.

The Arabic word al-Jūdiyy (ٱلْجُودِيّ), originates from the Syriac word Gudo (ܓܘܕܐ) meaning "Mounds" or "Elevations". The relation of some of the spellings is clear. The origin of Judi is less clear. It is usually interpreted as a corrupted version of the same name, via Al-Gurdi (Reynolds 2004). Since at least 697 BC, it was often held that after the ark came to rest on the mountain, Noah and the survivors of the flood (who were thought to have numbered 80) came down from it, and built this town to the south of the mountain, hence the name of Thamānīn (Arabic: ثَمَانِيْن, lit. 'Eighty'). The proposal that the two names are ultimately the same was first advanced by the English Orientalist George Sale. In his commentary about the Quran (11:4; the verse that mentions the landing of Noah's ark upon Al-Judiy), the English Orientalist George Sale said:

This mountain [al-Judi] is one of those that divide Armenia on the south, from Mesopotamia, and that part of Assyria which is inhabited by the Kurds, from whom the mountains took the name Cardu, or Gardu, by the Greeks turned into Gordyae, and other names. ... Mount Al-Judi (which seems to be a corruption, though it be constantly so written by the Arabs, for Jordi, or Giordi) is also called Thamanin (Geogr. Nub. p. 202), probably from a town at the foot of it (D'Herbel. Bibl. Orient. p. 404 and 676, and Agathiam, 1. 14, p. 135), so named from the number of persons saved in the ark, the word thamanin signifying eighty, and overlooks the country of Diyar Rab ah, near the cities of Mawsel, Forda, and Jazirat Ebn Omar, which last place one affirms to be but four miles from the place of the ark, and says that a Mohammedan temple was built there with the remains of the vessel by the Khalif Omar Ebn Abd'alaziz, whom he by mistake calls Omar Ebn Khattab (Benjamin. Itiner. p. 61). ... The relics of the ark were also to be seen here in the time of Epiphanius, if we may believe him (Epiph. Haeres. 18); and we are told the emperor Heraclius went from the town of Thamanin up to the mountain Al-Judi, and saw the place of the ark (Elmacin. 1. 1. c. 1 ).

— George Sale, 1734; p. 214-215

Thamanin (37°19′47.36″N 42°28′6.91″E) was known to the Assyrians as Tumurri or Tumurru, to the Romans as (Latin: Tamonitis or Tamoritis), and to the Armenians as (Armenian: Թմորիկ‘, romanized: Tmorik‘). Sale goes on to say that there was once a famous Christian monastery on the mountain, but that this was destroyed by lightning in the year 776 AD, following which:

the credit of this tradition hath declined, and given place to another, which obtains at present, and according to which the ark rested on Mount Masis, in Armenia, called by the Turks Agri Dagi.

— Sale, 1734; p. 214-215

The Arabic name of the mountain, Judi, has also been proposed to be a corruption of the Classical Syriac: ܩܪܕܘ, romanized: Qardō written in Arabic with the Arabic letters waw (و) and raa (ر) being confused in early Islamic manuscripts due to their early resemblance, and then making its way into the Qur’an and Islamic tradition. This is supported by the fact that only in the Syriac Bible is the mountain which Noah's ark rested on called Qardō, as opposed to Ararat in other Bibles.

== Religious traditions ==
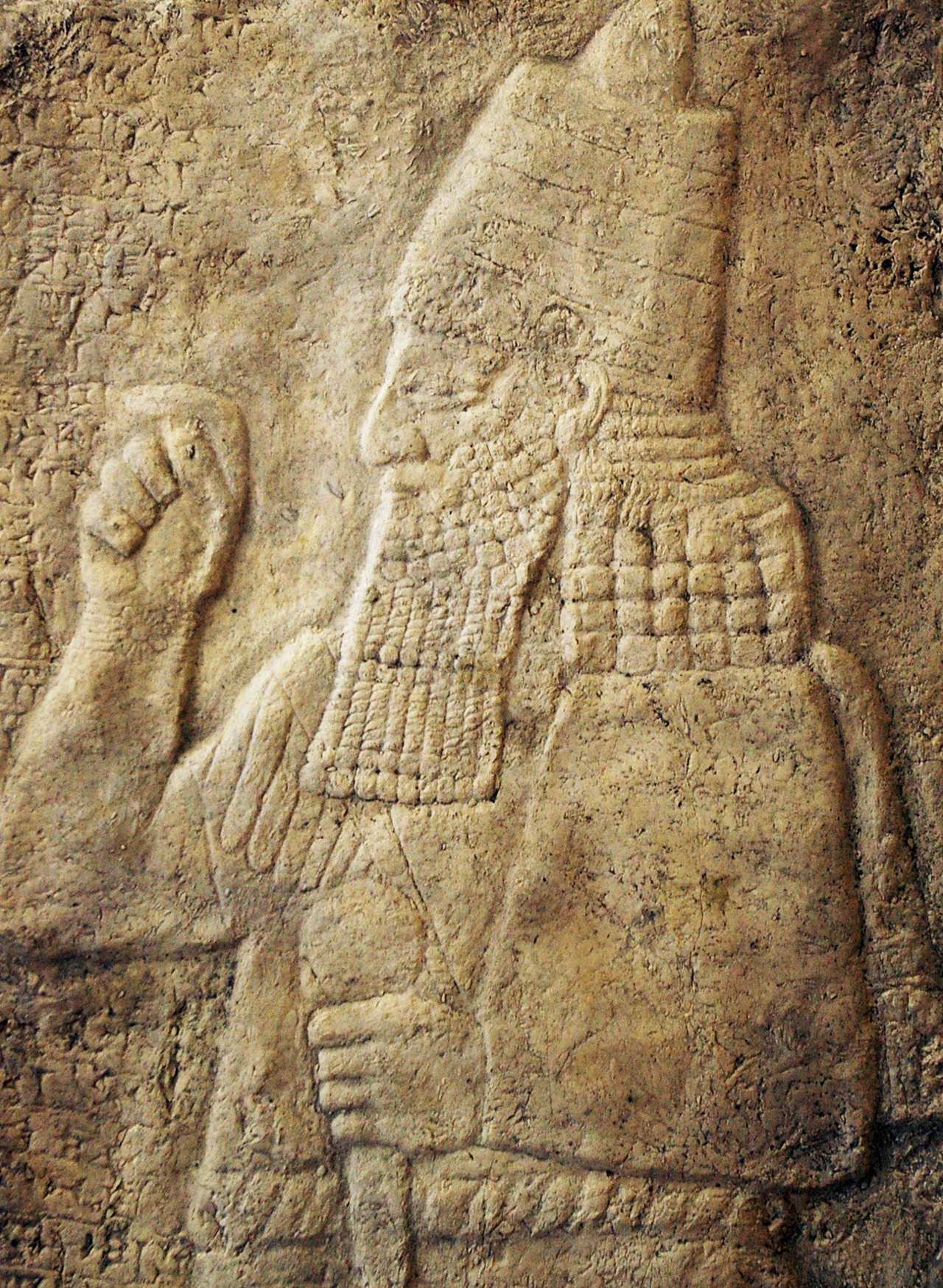
Cast of a rock relief of Sennacherib from the foot of the mountain, near Cizre

=== Christianity ===
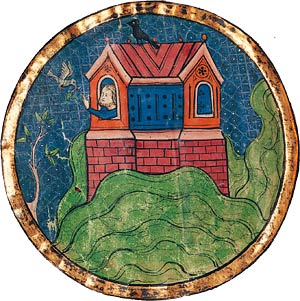
Depiction of Noah's ark landing on the mountain top, from the North French Hebrew Miscellany (13th century)

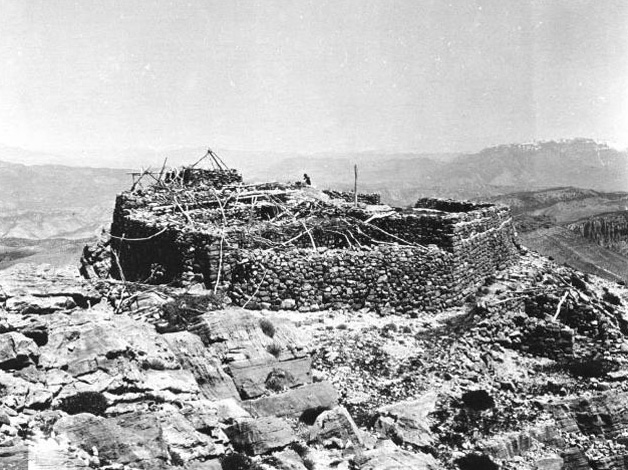
In 1909, Gertrude Bell photographed the ruins of a monastery on the summit of Cudi Dagh

The Assyrians east of the River Tigris had a legend of the ark resting on mount Djûdi in the land of Kard. This legend may in origin have been independent of the Genesis account of Noah's flood, rooted in the more general Near Eastern flood legends, but following the Christianization of the Syrians from about the second century AD, it became associated with the Mountains of Ararat, where Noah landed according to Genesis, and from Syria this legend also spread to the Armenians. The Armenians did not traditionally associate Noah's landing site with Mount Ararat, known natively as Masis, and continued to associate Noah's ark with Mount Judi, until the 11th century.

The biblical Ararat is thought to be a variation of Urartu, an ancient term for the region north of ancient Assyria, which encompasses the Armenian plateau. According to Josephus, the Armenians in the first century showed the remains of Noah's ark at a place called αποβατηριον "Place of Descent" (Armenian: Նախիջեւան, Nakhichevan, Ptolemy's Ναξουανα), about 60 miles (97 km) southeast of the summit of Mount Ararat (c. 39.07°N 45.08°E). The "mountains of Ararat" in Genesis have become identified in later (medieval) Christian tradition with the peak now known as "Mount Ararat" itself, a volcanic massif now in modern Turkey and known in Turkish as "Agri Dagh" (Ağrı Dağı).

=== Islam ===
According to the Qur'an (11:44), the final resting place of the vessel was called "Judi", without the word "mountain".

Then the word went forth: "O earth! swallow up thy water, and O sky! Withhold (thy rain)!" and the water abated, and the matter was ended. The Ark rested on Al-Judi, and the word went forth: "Away with those who do wrong!

— Quran, 11:44

The ninth century Persian geographer Ibn Khordadbeh identified the location of mount Judi as being in the land of Kurds (Al-Akrad), and the Abbasid historian Al-Mas'udi (c. 896–956) recorded that the spot where it came to rest could be seen in his time. Al-Mas'udi also said that the Ark began its voyage at Kufa in central Iraq, and sailed to Mecca, where it circled the Kaaba, before finally travelling to Judi. Yaqut al-Hamawi, also known as Al-Rumi, placed the mountain "above Jazirat ibn Umar, to the east of the Tigris," and mentioned a mosque built by Noah that could be seen in his day, and the traveller Ibn Battuta passed by the mountain in the 14th century.

== See also ==
- City of Nakhchivan
- İlandağ of the Lesser Caucasus in Nakhchivan, Azerbaijan
- Kochanis
- List of volcanoes in Turkey
  - Ararat anomaly
  - Mount Tendürek
    - The Durupınar site
  - Karaca Dağ near Diyarbakır
- List of mountains in Turkey
  - Mount Cilo
  - Mount Uludoruk
- Nesbin
- Searches for Noah's Ark
- Sinjar Mountains in Nineveh Governorate, Iraq
- Tel
