= John Baumgardner =

American creationist and geophysicist

John R. Baumgardner is an American young earth creationist and geophysicist.

== Biography ==
Baumgardner earned a B.S. from Texas Tech University in 1968, an M.S. from Princeton University in 1970, and a Ph.D. in geophysics and space physics from the University of California at Los Angeles in 1983. He worked at the Los Alamos National Laboratory and in 2002 joined the staff of the Institute for Creation Research. As a professional scientist, Baumgardner is known for developing TERRA, a finite element code designed to solve problems in mantle convection. In 1994 he presented research at a geophysics conference stating that the slip-sliding geologic plates that cover the Earth might once have moved thousands of times faster than they do today. In 1997, U.S. News & World Report described him as "the world's pre-eminent expert in the design of computer models for geophysical convection".

Baumgardner is a Christian who sometimes pursues creationist research. He has, for example, created a computer simulation called Terra to model the Noachian flood.

In 1985, Baumgardner joined the amateur adventurer Ron Wyatt and salvage expert David Fasold to Durupınar, Turkey, for an expedition recounted in Fasold's The Ark of Noah to locate the biblical ship's remains. Baumgardner did not support Wyatt's and Fasold's claims to have found a boat-shaped 'object' which was the Ark. He argued that the object was a natural formation.

== Select publications ==
According to Web of Science, he has published 20 peer-reviewed papers, including:

- Baumgardner, John R. (1 June 1985). "Three-dimensional treatment of convective flow in the earth's mantle". Journal of Statistical Physics. 39 (5–6): 501–11. Bibcode:1985JSP....39..501B. doi:10.1007/BF01008348. S2CID 121461665. cited 75 times.
- Bunge, H.P.; Richards, M.A.; Baumgardner, J.R. (1 February 1996). "Effect of depth-dependent viscosity on the planform of mantle convection". Letters to Nature. Nature. 379 (6564): 436–8. Bibcode:1996Natur.379..436B. doi:10.1038/379436a0. S2CID 40897219. cited 89 times
- Bunge, Hans-Peter; Richards, Mark A.; Baumgardner, John R. (10 June 1997). "A sensitivity study of three-dimensional spherical mantle convection at 10^{8} Rayleigh number: Effects of depth-dependent viscosity, heating mode, and an endothermic phase change". Journal of Geophysical Research. 102 (B6): 11991–2007. Bibcode:1997JGR...10211991B. doi:10.1029/96JB03806. cited 65 times.
- Sanford, J.C.; Baumgardner, J.; Brewer, W.; Gibson, P.; et al. (2007). "Mendel's Accountant: A biologically realistic forward-time population genetics program". Scalable Computing: Practice and Experience. 8 (2): 147–65.
