= Durupınar site =

Large aggregate structure in Doğubayazıt, Ağrı, Turkey

- Durupınar sitesi (Turkish)
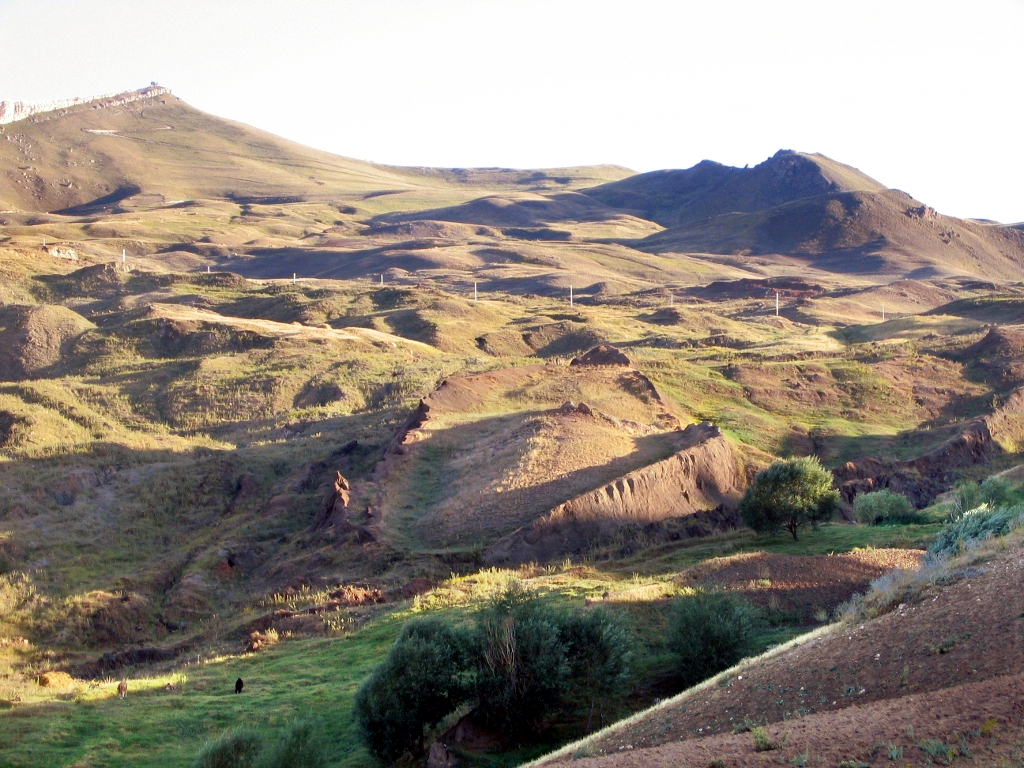
- The Durupınar site in 2007

- Location within Turkey Location within Near East Location within Asia
- 39°26′26.39″N 44°14′5.22″E
- Satellite of: Doğubayazıt
- Location: Üzengili, Turkey

Site notes
- Archaeologists: Prof. Ayhan Yardimciel
- Owner: Kafkas Üniversitesi, KARS
- Public access: Complete

The Durupınar site (Turkish: Durupınar sitesi) is a geological formation 164 metres (538 feet) long, made of limonite on Mount Tendürek in eastern Anatolia or Turkey. The size and shape of the formation led to its promotion by some believers as the petrified ruins of the original Noah's Ark. Adjacent to the village of Üzengili, the site is 3 kilometres (1.9 miles) north of the Iran-Turkey border, 16 kilometres (9.9 mi) southeast of Doğubayazıt in the Ağrı Province, and 29 km (18 mi) south of the Greater Mount Ararat summit, at an elevation of 1,966 to 2,004 m (6,450 to 6,575 ft) above sea level.

Geologists Lorence G. Collins and Andrew Snelling assert that it is an entirely natural formation, but have nominated it as (geological) heritage. This conclusion was corroborated by Dr. Eşref Atabey, a Turkish geological engineer and medical geologist of the General Directorate of Mineral Research and Exploration. The site is near several officially unnamed peaks, though locals call one of the nearby peaks Cudi Dağı in Turkish, which salvage expert David Fasold linked to Al Cudi, the place named in the Quran as the final resting place of Noah's Ark.

== Discovery and exploration ==
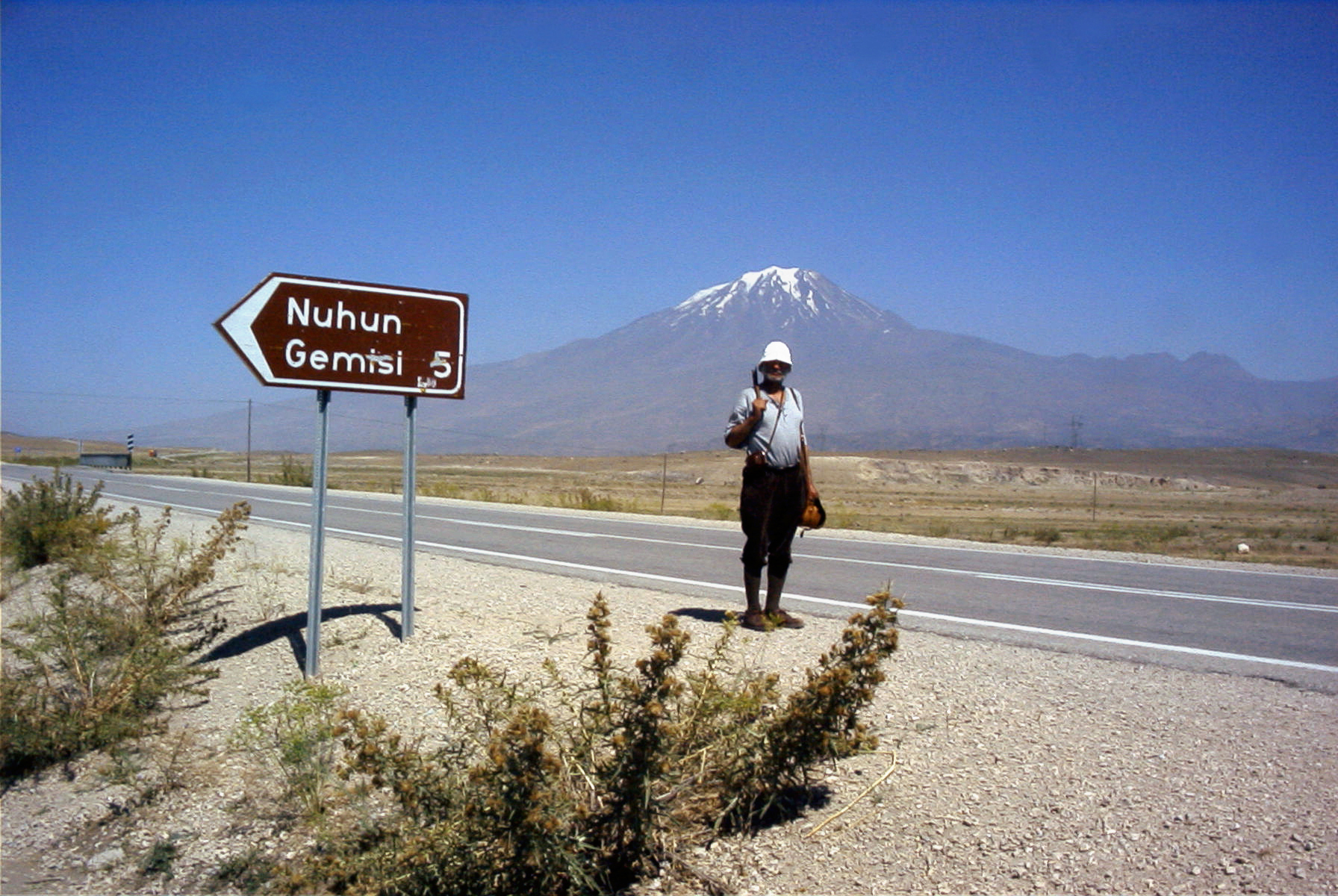
An official road sign near Doğubayazıt in Turkey with the words Nuhun Gemisi ("Noah's Ship") pointing the way to the Durupınar site and away from Mount Ararat

According to local reports, heavy rains combined with three earthquakes exposed the formation from the surrounding mud on May 19, 1948. It was discovered by a Kurdish shepherd named Reshit Sarihan. It was subsequently identified by Turkish Army Captain İlhan Durupınar—for whom it was subsequently named—in a Turkish Air Force aerial photo while on a mapping mission for NATO in October 1959. Durupınar informed the Turkish government of his discovery and a group from the Archeological Research Foundation which included George Vandeman, İlhan Durupınar, and Arthur Brandenberger, professor of photogrammetry, surveyed the site in September 1960. After two days of digging and dynamiting inside the "boat-shaped" formation, the expedition members found only soil and rocks. Their official news release concluded that "there were no visible archaeological remains" and that this formation "was a freak of nature and not man-made".

The site was then ignored until 1977, when it was rediscovered and promoted by pseudoarchaeologist and amateur explorer Ron Wyatt. Throughout the 1980s, Wyatt repeatedly tried to interest other people in the site, including ark hunter and former astronaut James Irwin and creationist John D. Morris, neither of whom was convinced the formation was the Ark. In 1985, Wyatt was joined by David Fasold and geophysicist John Baumgardner for the expedition recounted in Fasold's The Ark of Noah. As soon as Fasold saw the site, he exclaimed that it was a shipwreck. Fasold brought along ground-penetrating radar equipment and a "frequency generator", set it on the wavelength for iron, and searched the formation for internal iron loci (the latter technique was later compared to dowsing by the site's detractors). Fasold and the team states that the ground penetration radar revealed a regular internal formation and measured the length of the formation as 538 ft (164 m), close to the 300 cubits or 515 feet (157 m) of the Noah's Ark in the Bible, if the royal Ancient Egyptian cubit of 20.62 in (52.4 cm) is used. Fasold believed the team found the fossilized remains of the upper deck and that the original reed substructure had disappeared. In the nearby village of Kazan (formerly Arzap), they examined so-called drogue (anchor) stones that they believed were once attached to the ark.

Creationist commentators, such as Andrew Snelling in the Creation Ministries International journal Creation, wrote that "there are no scientific principles employed" in the "so-called frequency generator" used by Wyatt's team. He called it a "gadget, which is generally advertised in treasure-hunting magazines, not scientific journals" with "brass welding rods being used in essence, as divining rods, similar to the use of a forked stick to search for water."

Fasold asserted in his 1988 book that locals call one of the peaks near to the Durupınar site al Cudi (Turkish Cudi Dağı, Kurdish Çîyaye Cûdî) and linked this to the Mount Judi named in the Quran as the final resting place of Noah's Ark. The assertion is controversial and not well supported by local toponymy. After a few expeditions to the Durupınar site that included drilling and excavation in the 1990s, Fasold began to have doubts that the Durupınar formation was Noah's ark. He visited the site in September 1994 with Australian geologist Ian Plimer and concluded that the formation was not a boat. He surmised that ancient peoples had erroneously believed the site was the ark. In 1996, Fasold co-wrote a paper with geologist Lorence Collins titled "Bogus 'Noah's Ark' from Turkey Exposed as a Common Geologic Structure", which concluded that the boat-shaped formation was a natural stone formation that merely resembled a boat. The same paper pointed out that the "anchors" were local volcanic stone. The abstract reads:

A natural rock formation near Dogubayazit, Turkey, has been misidentified as Noah's Ark. Microscopic studies of a supposed iron bracket show that it is derived from weathered volcanic minerals. Supposed metal-braced walls are natural concentrations of limonite and magnetite in steeply inclined sedimentary layers in the limbs of a doubly plunging syncline. Supposed fossilized gopherwood bark is crinkled metamorphosed peridotite. Fossiliferous limestone, interpreted as cross cutting the syncline, preclude the formation from being Noah's Ark because these supposed "Flood" deposits are younger than the "Ark." Anchor stones at Kazan (Arzap) are derived from local andesite and not from Mesopotamia.

In April 1997, in sworn testimony at an Australian court case, Fasold repeated his doubts and noted that he regarded the claim that Noah's ark had been found as "absolute BS".

Others, such as fellow ark researcher David Allen Deal, reported that before his death, Fasold returned to a belief that the Durupınar site might be the location of the ark. His close Australian friend and biographer June Dawes wrote:

He [Fasold] kept repeating that no matter what the experts said, there was too much going for the Durupınar site for it to be dismissed. He remained convinced it was the fossilized remains of Noah's Ark.

In 2011, the Grand National Assembly of Turkey granted jurisdiction over Noah's ark works specifically to a five-professor Cultural Center Board of Directors from Ağrı İbrahim Çeçen University, as having precedence at the Durupınar site, overriding the Ministry of Culture and Tourism’s Immovable Cultural and Natural Assets High Council.

== Arzap stones ==
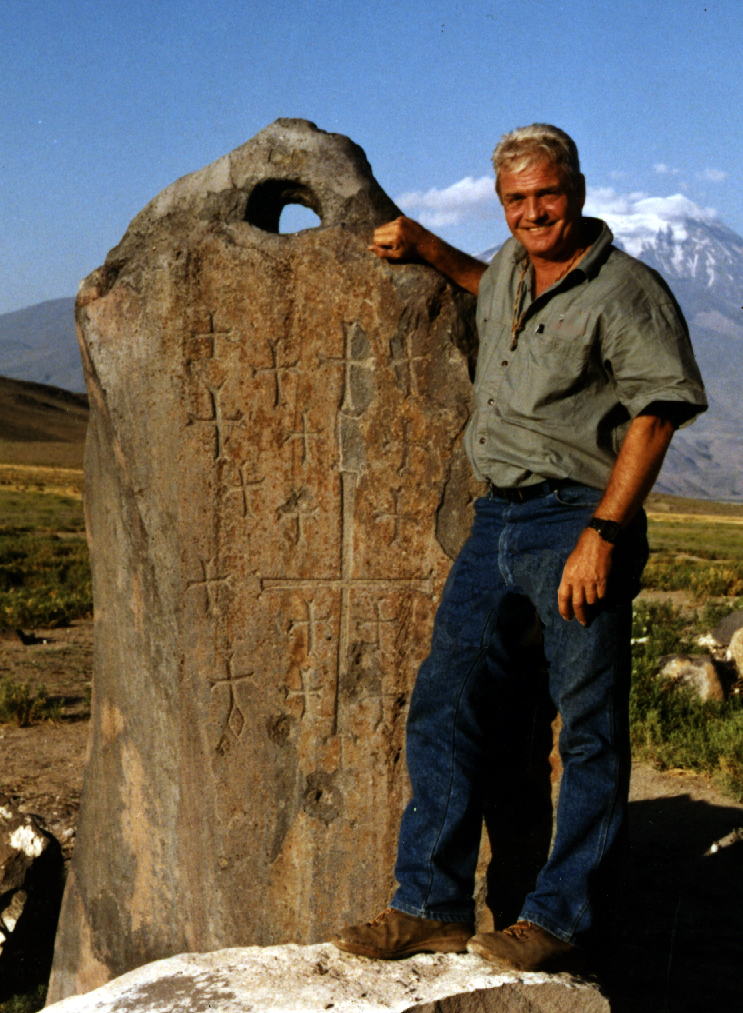
David Fasold, a promoter of the Durupınar site, standing beside what he claimed was a drogue stone; the crosses are believed to have been added during the Byzantine and Crusade periods.

The Arzap stones are a number of large standing stones found near the Durupınar site by amateur archaeologist Ron Wyatt with the aid of David Fasold and others. Fasold interpreted the artifacts as drogues, stone weights used to stabilize the Ark in rough seas, because they all have a chamfered hole cut at one end as if to fasten a rope to them, and his reading of the Epic of Gilgamesh, the Babylonian mythical account of the flood, suggested to him that such stones were used.

Drogue stones were the equivalent of a storm anchor on ancient ships. They have been found in the Nile and elsewhere in the Mediterranean area, and like the stones found by Wyatt and Fasold, they are heavy and flat with a hole for tying a line at one end. Their purpose was to create drag in the water or along shallow sandy bottoms: the stone was attached to one end of a boat, and the drag produced would cause the bow or stern to face into the wind and wind-blown waves.

A geological investigation of samples from the stones, published by geologist Lorence Collins in co-authorship with their original discoverer David Fasold, found that they are of local rock and thus could not have been brought from Mesopotamia, the Ark's supposed place of origin.

== See also ==
- Mountains of Ararat
- Searches for Noah's Ark

== Sources ==
- Dawes, June (2000). Noah's Ark: Adrift in Dark Waters. Belrose, NSW: Noahide. ISBN 978-0-646-40228-4.
- Fasold, David (1988). The Ark of Noah. New York: Wynwood. ISBN 978-0-922066-10-0.
