= Mountains of Ararat =

Place mentioned in the Book of Genesis

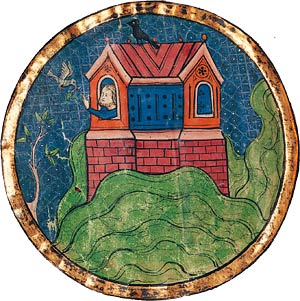
Depiction of Noah's Ark landing on the "mountains of Ararat", from the North French Hebrew Miscellany (13th century)

In the Book of Genesis, the mountains of Ararat (Biblical Hebrew הָרֵי אֲרָרָט, Tiberian hārê ’Ǎrārāṭ, Septuagint: τὰ ὄρη τὰ Ἀραράτ) is the term used to designate the region in which Noah's Ark comes to rest after the Great Flood. It corresponds to the ancient Assyrian term Urartu, a non-native name for the Armenian Kingdom of Van.

Since the Middle Ages the "mountains of Ararat" began to be identified with a mountain in present Turkey known as Masis or Ağrı Dağı; the mountain became known as Mount Ararat. The Kurdish population is primarily concentrated on the Van plateau, from which numerous tribes radiate over a vast area, including territories extending toward Mount Ararat.

== History ==
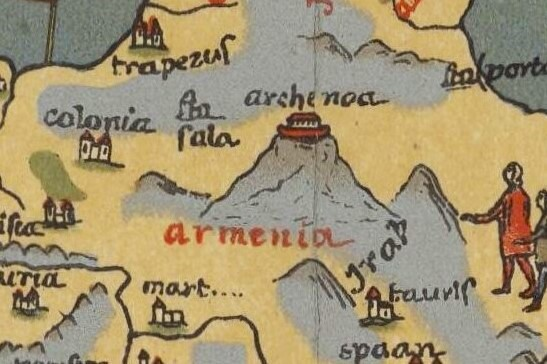
The ark on top of Mount Ararat in Armenia, from Martin Behaim's Erdapfel (1492)

Citing historians Berossus, Hieronymus the Egyptian, Mnaseas, and Nicolaus of Damascus, Josephus writes in his Antiquities of the Jews that "[t]he ark rested on the top of a certain mountain in Armenia, ... over Minyas, called Baris".

Likewise, in the Latin Vulgate, Jerome translates Genesis 8:4 to read: "Requievitque arca ... super montes Armeniae" ("and the ark rested ... on the mountains of Armenia"); though in the Nova Vulgata as promulgated after the Second Vatican Council, the toponym is amended to "montes Ararat" ("mountains of Ararat").

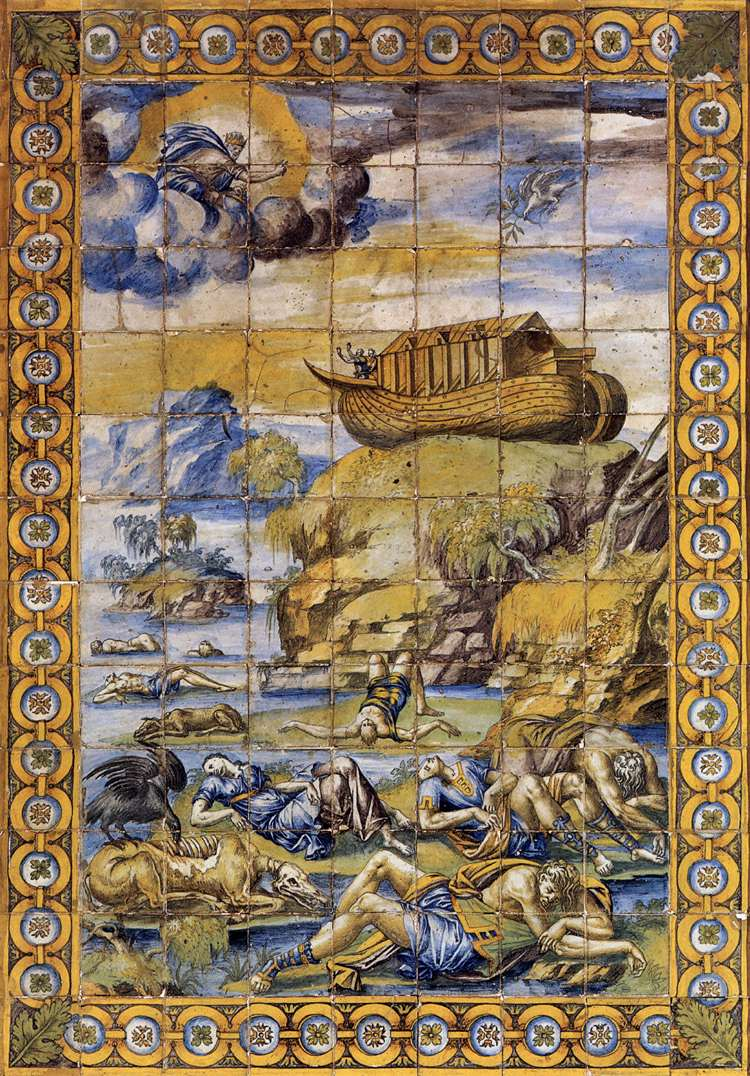
16th-century faience art depicting the ark atop Ararat

By contrast, early Syrian and Eastern tradition placed the ark on Mount Judi in ancient Upper Mesopotamia, what is now in Şırnak Province, Southeastern Anatolia Region, an association that had faded by the Middle Ages and is now mostly confined to Quranic tradition.

The Book of Jubilees specifies that the ark came to rest on the peak of Lubar, a mountain of Ararat.

Sir Walter Raleigh devotes several chapters of his Historie of the World (1614) to an argument that in ancient times the mountains of Ararat were understood to include not only those of Armenia, but also all of the taller mountain-ranges extending into Asia. He maintains that since Armenia is not actually located east of Shinar, (Note: See Genesis 11:2 in the King James Bible, following the Septuagint: "And it came to pass, as [the descendants of Noah] journeyed from the east (Septuagint: ἀπὸ ἀνατολῶν), that they found a plain in the land of Shinar; and they dwelt there." Ararat is in fact located to the northwest of Shinar; hence many translations depart from the Septuagint here, rendering the prepositional phrase as "eastward" or "to the east." This discrepancy is discussed extensively in biblical commentaries and elsewhere.) the ark must have landed somewhere in the Orient.

== See also ==
- Armenian highlands
  - Mount Ararat
  - Mount Tendürek
    - Durupınar site
- Searches for Noah's Ark
- River system of Mesopotamia
  - Euphrates
  - Tigris
- Taurus / Zagros Mountains
  - Mount Judi
