= David Fasold =

U.S. Merchant Marine officer and author

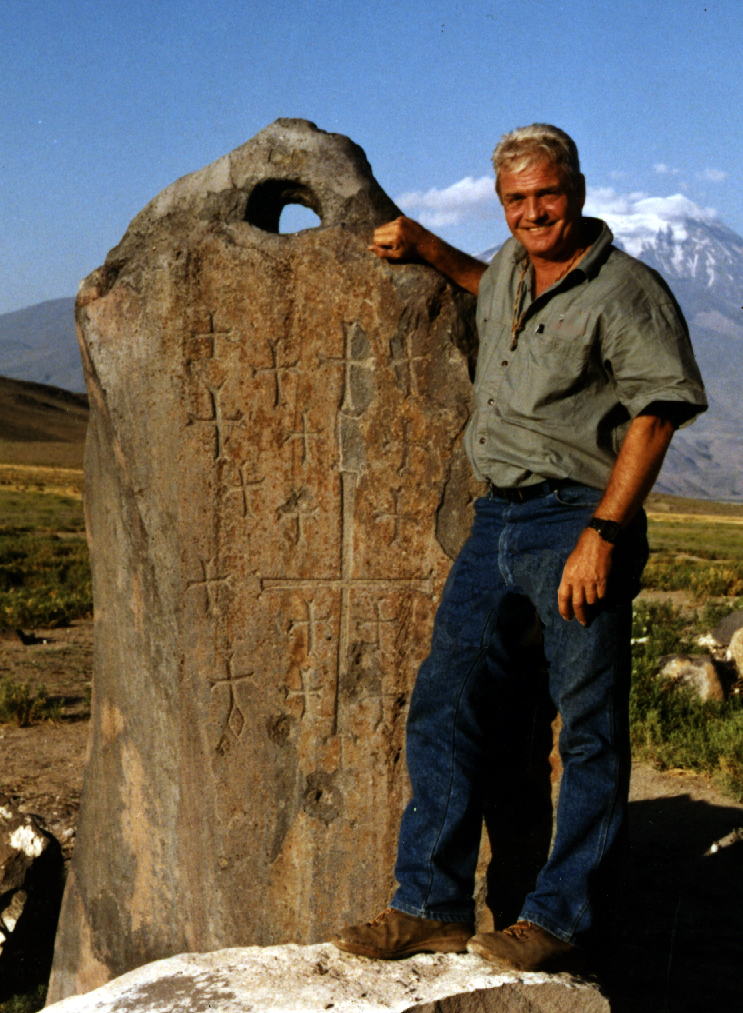
- David Fasold beside what he claimed is a drogue stone in Kazan (formerly called Arzap), Turkey
- Born: David Franklin Fasold; February 23, 1939; Chicago, Illinois, U.S.
- Died: April 26, 1998 (aged 59); Corvallis, Oregon, U.S.
- Known for: authoring The Ark of Noah, Plimer lawsuit

David Franklin Fasold (February 23, 1939 – April 26, 1998) was a United States Merchant Marine officer and salvage expert who is best known for his 1988 book The Ark of Noah, chronicling his early expeditions to the Durupınar Noah's Ark site in eastern Turkey. Repudiating and then changing his views about the site, Fasold was a participant in a suit with Australian geologist and skeptic Ian Plimer against an Australian creationist group. The suit, dubbed the "Monkey Trial II," was a notable case in the debate between science and religion and its role in society.

== Biography and marine career ==
Fasold was born in Chicago in 1939 and grew up in Wheaton, Illinois, son of Frank, an architect, and Ruth Fasold, who raised him as strict Plymouth Brethren. In 1957 he joined the United States Merchant Marine becoming an officer and traveling the world. He met his wife Anna Elizabeth Avila, from El Salvador, in San Jose, California, in the 1950s. After beginning a family he moved to Key West, Florida, where Fasold built up a respectable marine salvage company. In the 1970s and 1980s he assisted various marine treasure hunters, including Mel Fisher.

Fasold owned a photograph album showing the state visit of Benito Mussolini to Adolf Hitler's Nazi Germany that was published in 1970 as The Hitler Albums: Mussolini's State Visit to Germany, Sept. 25-29, 1937, with editorial assistance by Roger James Bender.

He raised two sons, Nathan and Michael, before dying of cancer in Corvallis, Oregon, on April 26, 1998, financially broken from years of expeditions and research.

== Durupınar site ==
Always interested in the history of the Bible and Noah's Ark, Fasold studied pre-Christian accounts of the Deluge and came to believe that the ark would be found not on Mount Ararat but somewhere to the southwest. In 1985, Fasold teamed up with Ron Wyatt to investigate the Durupınar site (located at approximately 39°26′26.26″N 44°14′04.26″E), a boat-shaped mound site named after Turkish Army Captain İlhan Durupınar who identified the formation in a Turkish Air Force aerial photo while on a mapping mission for NATO in 1959.

In 1985, Fasold and Wyatt were joined by geophysicist John Baumgardner for the expedition recounted in Fasold's 1988 book The Ark of Noah. As soon as Fasold saw the site, he exclaimed that it was a ship wreck. Fasold had brought a state-of-the-art frequency generator, set on the wavelength for iron and searched the formation for internal iron loci. This technique was later compared to dowsing by the site's detractors. Fasold and the team measured the length of the formation as 538 feet, close to the 300 cubits of the Bible if the Egyptian cubit of 20.6 inches is used. Later measurements by others found it to be 515 feet, exactly 300 Egyptian cubits in length. Fasold believed the team had found the fossilized remains of the upper deck and that the original reed substructure has disappeared. In the nearby village of Kazan (formerly called Arzap), so-called drogue stones that they believed were once attached to the ark were investigated.

=== The Ark of Noah and the break with Wyatt ===
The first edition of Fasold's book The Ark of Noah, showing the Durupınar site and the ark as a large reed boat.

Ron Wyatt and David Fasold were both featured on a 20/20 television special soon after their expedition. Charles Berlitz wrote of Fasold's searches in his 1987 book The Lost Ship of Noah, also printing part of an extensive 1985 interview with Fasold on pages 157-161. Wyatt wrote a small booklet, presenting his evidence found at the site, including what he considered petrified wood from deck timbers, pitch, and metal rivets. Fasold took a different approach, concentrating on pre-biblical literature and, as a nautical engineer, recognized the likelihood that it was made, like other ancient large boats and rafts, of reeds. He concluded that the enigmatic "gopher wood" of Genesis 6:14 was in fact a covering of bitumen and reeds, and the words was related to kaphar or pitch . He also made the claim that there were two Dilmuns, one located on Bahrain and the original one in the Zagros mountains. In 1988, Fasold published his own book, The Ark of Noah.

In The Ark of Noah, Fasold took many fundamentalists and creationists to task for insisting that the ark was rectangular in shape, made of wood, and must have landed on Mount Ararat (when the Bible states "the mountains of Ararat"). He also critically examined and dismissed many previous ark sightings at Ararat. The exposure of his find in the media led to further expeditions to the site in the late 1980s and early 1990s. During this time, Wyatt supposedly discovered petrified wood and metal items, and exposed the remains of decayed rib timbers at the site. Fasold doubted many of Wyatt's claims during this time, and broke with Wyatt's interpretations. During this time, Fasold formed the Noahide Society and issued a newsletter called Ark-Update. He also produced several audio and video tapes.

=== Doubts and changing views ===
During the 1990s, Fasold was caught between three opposing camps, all of whom derided his interest in the site: orthodox creationists who believed the ark could only lie on Mount Ararat; Wyatt and others who continued their research and reported significant discoveries; and skeptical geologists and biblical minimalists who called the site a hoax.

After a few expeditions to the Durupınar site that included drillings and excavation in the 1990s, Fasold began to have doubts that the Durupınar formation was Noah's ark. Following a September 1994 site visit with geologist Ian Plimer, he noted: "I believe this may be the oldest running hoax in history. I think we have found what the ancients said was the Ark, but this structure is not Noah's Ark." At other times he claimed that the site was only what the ancients believed was Ziusudra's 'ark of reeds'. In 1996 Fasold coauthored a paper with geologist Lorence Collins entitled "Bogus 'Noah's Ark' from Turkey Exposed as a Common Geologic Structure" that concluded the boat-shaped formation was a curious upswelling of mud that happened to look like a boat. In April 1997 during his testimony in an Australian court case Fasold repudiated his belief in the Ark, and stated that he regarded the claim as "absolute BS".

Ark researchers David Allen Deal and Robert Michelson, and Australian friend and biographer June Dawes reported that before his 1998 death Fasold again claimed the Durupınar site to be the location of the ark. Dawes wrote:

He [Fasold] kept repeating that no matter what the experts said, there was too much going for the [Durupınar] site for it to be dismissed. He remained convinced it was the fossilized remains of Noah's Ark.

However, in a letter to the journal Perspectives on Science and Christian Faith in 2016, his erstwhile collaborator Lorence Collins disputed this claim. According to Collins, Fasold maintained his view that Durunipar was not the Ark till the end of his life. Collins further emphasized the financial cost that this decision, as having cancelled the book publication, he died virtually penniless.

== Jabal al-Lawz as Mount Sinai ==
In 1986 Fasold, along with Ron Wyatt, was one of the first Americans to investigate the notion that Jabal al-Lawz in Saudi Arabia might be the Biblical Mount Sinai. During an illegal trek through the desert around the mountain, Wyatt and Fasold were arrested and detained for a short period. Former New York Times journalist Howard Blum wrote of Fasold's journeys in his 1998 book The Gold of Exodus.

== Plimer case ==
In 1997, Fasold was involved in an Australian lawsuit against creationist Allen Roberts, who reproduced some of Fasold's artwork without permission. Co-plaintiff Ian Plimer, an Australian humanist and skeptic, sued Roberts's organization Ark Search under the Fair Trading Act, alleging that they had made false and misleading claims about the Durupinar site. The case, touted as a second Scopes Monkey Trial, failed, with Judge Ron Sackville ruling: "Courts should not attempt to provide a remedy for every false or misleading statement made in the course of public debate on matters of general interest." Fasold described the award of $2,500 Australian dollars in damages as for copyright infringement as "a slap in the face."

== Works ==
=== Books ===
- Fasold, David F.; Bender, Roger James. (1970). The Hitler Albums: Mussolini's State Visit to Germany, Sept. 25-29, 1937. R. James Bender Publishing.
- Fasold, David (1989). The Ark of Noah. Bonners Ferry, ID: Wynwood Press. p. 331. ISBN 978-0922066100.
- Fasold, David (1990). The Discovery of Noah's Ark. Basingstoke, Hants, southern England: Pan Macmillan imprint Sidgwick & Jackson. p. 352. ISBN 978-0283060069.

=== Articles ===
- Collins, Lorence D.; Fasold, David (1996). "Bogus 'Noah's Ark' from Turkey Exposed as a Common Geologic Structure". Journal of Geoscience Education. 44 (4): 439–44. Bibcode:1996JGeEd..44..439C. doi:10.5408/1089-9995-44.4.439. hdl:10211.2/3026. Full text

=== Video ===
- Fasold, David (1993). The Discovery of Noah's Ark (Documentary). Westlake Village, CA: American Media.
- Plimer, Ian, and David Fasold (1994). Crusaders for the Lost Ark (Documentary). Sydney: Australian Broadcasting Corp.

== Sources ==
=== Books ===
- Berlitz, Charles (1987). The Lost Ship of Noah. New York: Putnam. ISBN 0-399-13182-5.
- Blum, Howard (1998). The Gold of Exodus: The Discovery of the True Mount Sinai. New York: Simon & Schuster. ISBN 0-684-80918-4.
- Coleman, Simon (2004). The Cultures of Creationism. Aldershot: Ashgate. ISBN 0-7546-0912-X.
- Dawes, June (2000). Noah's Ark: Adrift in Dark Waters. Belrose, NSW: Noahide. ISBN 0-646-40228-5.
- Deal, David Allen (2005). Noah's Ark: The Evidence. Muscogee, OK: Artisan. ISBN 0-933677-02-2.
- Fasold, David (1988). The Ark of Noah. New York: Wynwood. ISBN 0-922066-10-8.
- Nissen, Henri (2005). Noah's Ark Uncovered: An Expedition into the Ancient Past. City: Scandinavia Publishing House. ISBN 87-7247-813-6.
- Sellier, Charles; David Balsiger (1995). The Incredible Discovery of Noah's Ark. New York: Dell. ISBN 0-440-21799-7.
- Wilson, Ian (2002). Before the Flood. New York: St. Martin's Press. ISBN 0-312-30400-5.
- Wyatt, Ron (1989). Discovered: Noah's Ark!. Nashville: World Bible Society. ISBN 0-942521-43-9.

=== Articles ===
- Finkel, Elizabeth (6 June 1997). "Ark Claim Survives Court Fight". Science. 276 (5318): 1493–4. doi:10.1126/science.276.5318.1493a. PMID 9190684. S2CID 153263169.
- Finkel, Elizabeth (18 April 1997). "Creationism Suit: Australian Geologist Battles 'Ark' Claim". Science. 276 (5311): 348. doi:10.1126/science.276.5311.348. S2CID 159636408.
- "Noah battles Darwin in Australian courtroom". Turkish Daily News. 14 April 1997.
- Pockley, Peter (5 June 1997). "Geologist Loses 'Creationism' Challenge". Nature. 387 (6633): 540. Bibcode:1997Natur.387..540P. doi:10.1038/42331. PMID 9177329.
- Pockley, Peter (6 November 1994). "Theory blown out of the water". Australian Sun-Herald.

=== Video ===
- Griffin, G. Edward (1993). The Discovery of Noah's Ark (Documentary). Westlake Village, CA: American Media.
