= Keshar, Iran =

Keshar or Kashar (Persian: كشار) may refer to:

- Keshar-e Bala, village in Hormozgan province
- Keshar-e Chemerdan, village in Hormozgan province
- Keshar-e Dustani, village in Hormozgan province
- Keshar-e Sargap, village in Hormozgan province
- Keshar-e Zir, village in Hormozgan province
- Keshar Rural District, an administrative division of Khamir County, Hormozgan province
- Keshar-e Olya, village in Tehran province
- Keshar-e Sofla, village in Tehran province
