= Nimeh Kar, Khamir =

Village in Hormozgan province, Iran

Nimeh Kar Persian: نيمه كار
- Village
- Location within Iran
- Coordinates: 27°13′59″N 55°44′44″E
- Country: Iran
- Province: Hormozgan
- County: Khamir
- District: Kahurestan
- Rural District: Latidan

Population (2016)
  - Total: 1,787
- Time zone: UTC+3:30 (IRST)

Nimeh Kar (Persian: نيمه كار) (Note: Also romanized as Nīmeh Kār and Nīmehkār) is a village in, and the capital of, Latidan Rural District of Kahurestan District, Khamir County, Hormozgan province, Iran.

== Demographics ==
=== Population ===
At the time of the 2006 National Census, the village's population was 1,557 in 313 households, when it was in Kahurestan Rural District of the Central District. The following census in 2011 counted 1,705 people in 408 households. The 2016 census measured the population of the village as 1,787 people in 489 households.

After the 2016 census, the rural district was separated from the district in the formation of Kahurestan District. Nimeh Kar was transferred to Latidan Rural District created in the new district.
