= Shahr Jadid-e Alavi =

Coordinates: 27°16′55.73″N 55°59′37.56″E

Shahr Jadid-e Alvi شهرجديدعلوي
- Village
- Interactive map of Shahr Jadid-e Alvi
- Country: Iran
- Province: Hormozgan
- County: Khamir
- Bakhsh: Central
- Rural District: Kohurestan

Population (2006)
  - Total: 189
- Time zone: UTC+3:30 (IRST)
  - Summer (DST): UTC+4:30 (IRDT)

Shahr Jadid-e Alvi (Persian: شهرجديدعلوي, also Romanized as Shahr Jadīd-e ʿAlvī) is a village in Kohurestan Rural District, in the Central District of Khamir County, Hormozgan Province, Iran. At the 2006 census, its population was 189, in 41 families.
