= Pahel =

Pahel may refer to these places in Iran:

- Pol-e Angur, Hormozgan province
- Pol-e Sharqi, Hormozgan province

== See also ==
- Paheli (disambiguation)
