= Al-e Darvish =

Al-e Darvish ال درويش
- Village
- Location within Iran
- Coordinates: 27°10′11″N 55°38′51″E
- Country: Iran
- Province: Hormozgan
- County: Khamir
- Bakhsh: Central
- Rural District: Khamir

Population (2006)
  - Total: 228
- Time zone: UTC+3:30 (IRST)
  - Summer (DST): UTC+4:30 (IRDT)

Al-e Darvish (Persian: ال درويش, also Romanized as Āl-e Darvīsh and Āl Darvīsh) is a village in Khamir Rural District, in the Central District of Khamir County, Hormozgan Province, Iran. At the 2006 census, its population was 228, in 58 families.
