= Ashkan =

Ashkan may refer to:

== Places in Iran ==
- Ashkan, Hormozgan, a village in Bashagard County, Hormozgan Province
- Ashkan-e Olya, a village in Sardasht County, West Azerbaijan Province
- Tang Ashkan, a village in Khamir County, Hormozgan Province

== People ==
- Ashkan Dejagah (born 1986), Iranian professional footballer
- Ashkan Mokhtarian (born 1985), Iranian-born Australian mixed martial artist
- Ashkan Pouya (born 1976), Swedish entrepreneur and the co-founder of Serendipity Group

== See also ==
- Ashcan (disambiguation)
