= Pol-e Gel Kani =

Pol-e Gel Kani پل گل كني
- Village
- Location within Iran
- Coordinates: 27°00′04″N 55°42′32″E
- Country: Iran
- Province: Hormozgan
- County: Khamir
- Bakhsh: Central
- Rural District: Khamir

Population (2006)
  - Total: 628
- Time zone: UTC+3:30 (IRST)
  - Summer (DST): UTC+4:30 (IRDT)

Pol-e Gel Kani (Persian: پل گل كني, also Romanized as Pol-e Gel Kanī; also known as Gel Kan-e Pahel, Golkan Pol, Pīr Ḩarīreh, Pol-e Gelkan, and Pol-e Gel Kan) is a village in Khamir Rural District, in the Central District of Khamir County, Hormozgan Province, Iran. At the 2006 census, its population was 628, in 133 families.
