= Jeyhun, Iran =

Village in Hormozgan province, Iran

Jeyhun Persian: جيحون
- Village
- Location within Iran
- Coordinates: 27°18′24″N 55°10′36″E
- Country: Iran
- Province: Hormozgan
- County: Khamir
- District: Kahurestan
- Rural District: Kahurestan

Population (2016)
  - Total: 743
- Time zone: UTC+3:30 (IRST)

Jeyhun (Persian: جيحون) (Note: Also romanized as Ceyḥûn and Jeyḥūn) is a village in, and the capital of, Kahurestan Rural District of Kahurestan District, Khamir County, Hormozgan province, Iran. The previous capital of the rural district was the village of Kahurestan.

== Demographics ==
=== Population ===
At the time of the 2006 National Census, the village's population was 500 in 107 households, when it was in the Central District. The following census in 2011 counted 643 people in 139 households. The 2016 census measured the population of the village as 743 people in 193 households.

After the 2016 census, the rural district was separated from the district in the formation of Kahurestan District.
