= Dasht Jeyhun =

Dasht Jeyhun دشت جيحون
- Village
- Location within Iran
- Coordinates: 27°16′26″N 55°04′51″E
- Country: Iran
- Province: Hormozgan
- County: Khamir
- Bakhsh: Central
- Rural District: Kohurestan

Population (2006)
  - Total: 245
- Time zone: UTC+3:30 (IRST)
  - Summer (DST): UTC+4:30 (IRDT)

Dasht Jeyhun (Persian: دشت جيحون, also Romanized as Dasht Jeyḩūn; also known as Jaihūn, and Jeyḩūn) is a village in Kohurestan Rural District, in the Central District of Khamir County, Hormozgan Province, Iran. At the 2006 census, its population was 245, in 44 families.
