= Gari Sheykh =

Gari Sheykh گري شيخ
- Village
- Location within Iran
- Coordinates: 27°07′33″N 55°43′06″E
- Country: Iran
- Province: Hormozgan
- County: Khamir
- Bakhsh: Central
- Rural District: Khamir

Population (2006)
  - Total: 432
- Time zone: UTC+3:30 (IRST)
  - Summer (DST): UTC+4:30 (IRDT)

Gari Sheykh (Persian: گري شيخ, also Romanized as Garī Sheykh and Gerī Sheykh; also known as Goor Sheikh and Gūrī Sheykh) is a village in Khamir Rural District, in the Central District of Khamir County, Hormozgan Province, Iran. At the 2006 census, its population was 432, in 98 families.
