= Chahru =

Chahru چاه رو
- Village
- Location within Iran
- Coordinates: 27°08′15″N 55°41′51″E
- Country: Iran
- Province: Hormozgan
- County: Khamir
- Bakhsh: Central
- Rural District: Khamir

Population (2006)
  - Total: 204
- Time zone: UTC+3:30 (IRST)
  - Summer (DST): UTC+4:30 (IRDT)

Chahru (Persian: چاه رو, also Romanized as Chāhrū; also known as Chāh Rakū and Chāh Rūd) is a village in Khamir Rural District, in the Central District of Khamir County, Hormozgan Province, Iran. At the 2006 census, its population was 204, in 47 families.
