= Gevin =

Gevin or Geveyn or Guyin (Persian: گوين) may refer to:

- Gevin, Bashagard, Hormozgan Province
- Gevin, Khamir, Hormozgan Province
- Guyin, Kerman
- Webb, Paul
