= Kermaran =

Kermaran كرمران
- Village
- Location within Iran
- Coordinates: 27°20′45″N 55°18′36″E
- Country: Iran
- Province: Hormozgan
- County: Khamir
- Bakhsh: Ruydar
- Rural District: Ruydar

Population (2006)
  - Total: 352
- Time zone: UTC+3:30 (IRST)
  - Summer (DST): UTC+4:30 (IRDT)

Kermaran (Persian: كرمران, also Romanized as Kermarān and Kermerān; also known as Kerīmnūn and Kirimun) is a village in Ruydar Rural District, Ruydar District, Khamir County, Hormozgan Province, Iran. At the 2006 census, its population was 352, in 90 families.
