= Banu, Khamir =

Coordinates: 28.4592°N 51.8497°E

Banu بنو
- Village
- Interactive map of Banu
- Country: Iran
- Province: Hormozgan
- County: Khamir
- Bakhsh: Ruydar
- Rural District: Ruydar

Population (2006)
  - Total: 420
- Time zone: UTC+3:30 (IRST)
  - Summer (DST): UTC+4:30 (IRDT)

Banu (Persian: بنو, also Romanized as Banū) is a village in Ruydar Rural District, Ruydar District, Khamir County, Hormozgan Province, Iran. At the 2006 census, its population was 420, in 95 families.
