= Pas Bast =

Pas Bast پس بست
- Village
- Location within Iran
- Coordinates: 26°53′04″N 54°58′16″E
- Country: Iran
- Province: Hormozgan
- County: Khamir
- Bakhsh: Ruydar
- Rural District: Ruydar

Population (2006)
  - Total: 166
- Time zone: UTC+3:30 (IRST)

Pas Bast (Persian: پس بست) is a village in Ruydar Rural District, in the Ruydar District of Khamir County, Hormozgan Province, Iran. At the 2006 census, its population was 166, in 34 families.
