= Darva Khani =

Darva Khani درواخاني
- Village
- Location within Iran
- Coordinates: 27°19′17″N 55°22′54″E
- Country: Iran
- Province: Hormozgan
- County: Khamir
- Bakhsh: Ruydar
- Rural District: Ruydar

Population (2006)
  - Total: 722
- Time zone: UTC+3:30 (IRST)
  - Summer (DST): UTC+4:30 (IRDT)

Darva Khani (Persian: درواخاني, also Romanized as Darvā Khānī and Darvākhānī; also known as Darū and Darvā) is a village in Ruydar Rural District, Ruydar District, Khamir County, Hormozgan Province, Iran. At the 2006 census, its population was 337, in 74 families.
