= Chah Gowd-e Chamardan =

Chah Gowd-e Chamardan چاه گود چمردان
- Village
- Location within Iran
- Coordinates: 27°16′10″N 56°00′45″E
- Country: Iran
- Province: Hormozgan
- County: Khamir
- Bakhsh: Central
- Rural District: Kohurestan

Population (2006)
  - Total: 133
- Time zone: UTC+3:30 (IRST)
  - Summer (DST): UTC+4:30 (IRDT)

Chah Gowd-e Chamardan (Persian: چاه گود چمردان, also Romanized as Chāh Gowd-e Chamardān; also known as Chāh Gowd) is a village in Kohurestan Rural District, in the Central District of Khamir County, Hormozgan Province, Iran. At the 2006 census, its population was 133, in 28 families.
