= Tang Dalan =

Tang Dalan تنگ دالان
- Village
- Location within Iran
- Coordinates: 27°20′27″N 55°05′01″E
- Country: Iran
- Province: Hormozgan
- County: Khamir
- Bakhsh: Central
- Rural District: Kohurestan

Population (2006)
  - Total: 183
- Time zone: UTC+3:30 (IRST)
  - Summer (DST): UTC+4:30 (IRDT)

Tang Dalan (Persian: تنگ دالان, also Romanized as Tang Dālān and Tang-e Dālān; also known as Pas Par Dālān) is a village in Kohurestan Rural District, in the Central District of Khamir County, Hormozgan Province, Iran. At the 2006 census, its population was 183, in 38 families.
