= Derikha =

Derikha دريخا
- Village
- Location within Iran
- Coordinates: 27°22′33″N 55°53′05″E
- Country: Iran
- Province: Hormozgan
- County: Khamir
- Bakhsh: Kohurestan District
- Rural District: Kohurestan

Population (2006)
  - Total: 108
- Time zone: UTC+3:30 (IRST)
  - Summer (DST): UTC+4:30 (IRDT)

Derikha (Persian: دريخا, also Romanized as Derīkhā; also known as Derīkhvāh) is a village in Kohurestan Rural District, in the Kohurestan district (Khamir County) of Khamir County, Hormozgan Province, Iran. At the 2006 census, its population was 108, in 30 families.
