= Lashtaghan-e Pain va Bala =

Lashtaghan-e Pain va Bala لشتغان پايين وبالا
- Village
- Location within Iran
- Coordinates: 26°56′15″N 55°33′45″E
- Country: Iran
- Province: Hormozgan
- County: Khamir
- Bakhsh: Central
- Rural District: Khamir

Population (2006)
  - Total: 2,745
- Time zone: UTC+3:30 (IRST)
  - Summer (DST): UTC+4:30 (IRDT)

Lashtaghan-e Pain va Bala (Persian: لشتغان پايين وبالا, also Romanized as Lashtaghān-e Pā’īn va Bālā; also known as Lashtaghān-e Pā’īn, Lashteqān-e Pā’īn, and Lashteqān Pā‘īn) is a village in Khamir Rural District, in the Central District of Khamir County, Hormozgan Province, Iran. At the 2006 census, its population was 2,745, in 532 families.
