= Pay Par =

Pay Par پي پر
- Village
- Location within Iran
- Coordinates: 27°23′11″N 55°47′09″E
- Country: Iran
- Province: Hormozgan
- County: Khamir
- Bakhsh: Central
- Rural District: Kohurestan

Population (2006)
  - Total: 45
- Time zone: UTC+3:30 (IRST)
  - Summer (DST): UTC+4:30 (IRDT)

Pay Par (Persian: پي پر, also Romanized as Pāy Par) is a village in Kohurestan Rural District, in the Central District of Khamir County, Hormozgan Province, Iran. At the 2006 census, its population was 45, in 8 families.
