= Chah Sahari =

Chah Sahari چاه صحاري
- Village
- Location within Iran
- Coordinates: 26°59′58″N 55°40′35″E
- Country: Iran
- Province: Hormozgan
- County: Khamir
- Bakhsh: Central
- Rural District: Khamir

Population (2006)
  - Total: 346
- Time zone: UTC+3:30 (IRST)
  - Summer (DST): UTC+4:30 (IRDT)

Chah Sahari (Persian: چاه صحاري, also Romanized as Chāh Şaḩārī; also known as Chāh Sārī) is a village in Khamir Rural District, in the Central District of Khamir County, Hormozgan Province, Iran. At the 2006 census, its population was 346, in 69 families.
