= Dargur =

Village in Hormozgan province, Iran

Dargur Persian: درگور
- Village
- Location within Iran
- Coordinates: 27°09′10″N 55°39′25″E
- Country: Iran
- Province: Hormozgan
- County: Khamir
- District: Central
- Rural District: Khamir

Population (2016)
  - Total: 1,555
- Time zone: UTC+3:30 (IRST)

Dargur (Persian: درگور) (Note: Also romanized as Dar Gur and Dar Gūr) is a village in, and the capital of, Khamir Rural District of the Central District of Khamir County, Hormozgan province, Iran. The previous capital of the rural district was the village of Pol, now a city.

== Demographics ==
=== Population ===
At the time of the 2006 National Census, the village's population was 1,153 in 282 households. The following census in 2011 counted 1,407 people in 403 households. The 2016 census measured the population of the village as 1,555 people in 448 households.
