= Gishu =

Gishu may refer to:

- Gisu
- Gīshu, a fictional character
- Gishu, Hormozgan, a village in Iran
- Gishu, Kerman, a village in Iran
