= Gishu, Hormozgan =

Gishu گيشو
- Village
- Location within Iran
- Coordinates: 27°23′10″N 55°41′48″E
- Country: Iran
- Province: Hormozgan
- County: Khamir
- Bakhsh: Ruydar
- Rural District: Rudbar

Population (2006)
  - Total: 211
- Time zone: UTC+3:30 (IRST)
  - Summer (DST): UTC+4:30 (IRDT)

Gishu (Persian: گيشو, also Romanized as Gīshū) is a village in Rudbar Rural District, Ruydar District, Khamir County, Hormozgan Province, Iran. At the 2006 census, its population was 211, in 56 families.
