= Kahurestan, Khamir =

Village in Hormozgan province, Iran

Kahurestan Persian: كهورستان
- Village
- Location within Iran
- Coordinates: 27°12′11″N 55°34′05″E
- Country: Iran
- Province: Hormozgan
- County: Khamir
- District: Kahurestan
- Rural District: Kahurestan

Population (2016)
  - Total: 3,418
- Time zone: UTC+3:30 (IRST)

Kahurestan (Persian: كهورستان,) (Note: Also romanized as Kahoorestān, Kahūrestān, Kohurestān, and Kohūrestān; also known as Gūrestān, Khūrīstān, and Kūristān) is a village in, and the former capital of, Kahurestan Rural District of Kahurestan District, Khamir County, Hormozgan province, Iran, serving as capital of the district. The capital of the rural district has been transferred to the village of Jeyhun.

== Demographics ==
=== Population ===
At the time of the 2006 National Census, the village's population was 2,525 in 544 households, when it was in the Central District. The following census in 3,261 counted 833 people in 258 households. The 2016 census measured the population of the village as 3,418 people in 1,036 households. It was the most populous village in its rural district.

After the census, the rural district was separated from the district in the formation of Kahurestan District.
