= Rudar =

Rudar may refer to:

== Geography ==
Rudar (Persian: رودار) may refer to:

- Rudar, Hormozgan
- Rudar, alternate name of Rudbar, Khamir, Hormozgan Province
- Rudar, Kerman

== Sports ==
Rudar (Serbian Cyrillic: Рудар) means 'miner' in South Slavic languages. As such, it became the name of a number of sports clubs based in mining towns across the former Yugoslavia.

- FK Rudar Breza, football club from Breza, Bosnia and Herzegovina
- FK Rudar Kakanj, football club from Kakanj, Bosnia and Herzegovina
- FK Rudar Kostolac, football club from Kostolac, Serbia
- NK Rudar Labin, football club from Labin, Croatia
- FK Rudar Pljevlja, football club from Pljevlja, Montenegro
- FK Rudar Prijedor, football club from Prijedor, Bosnia and Herzegovina
- FK Rudar Probištip, football club from Probištip, North Macedonia
- NK Rudar Trbovlje, football club from Trbovlje, Slovenia
- FK Rudar Ugljevik, football club from Ugljevik, Bosnia and Herzegovina
- NK Rudar Velenje, football club from Velenje, Slovenia
