= Gishi, Hormozgan =

Gishi گيشي
- Village
- Location within Iran
- Coordinates: 27°19′12″N 55°21′44″E
- Country: Iran
- Province: Hormozgan
- County: Khamir
- Bakhsh: Ruydar
- Rural District: Ruydar

Population (2006)
  - Total: 338
- Time zone: UTC+3:30 (IRST)
  - Summer (DST): UTC+4:30 (IRDT)

Gishi (Persian: گيشي, also romanized as Gīshī; also known as Kīshī) is a village in Ruydar Rural District, Ruydar District, Khamir County, Hormozgan Province, Iran. At the 2006 census, its population was 338, in 65 families.
