= Keshar-e Bala =

Village in Hormozgan province, Iran

Keshar-e Bala Persian: كشاربالا
- Village
- Location within Iran
- Coordinates: 27°16′08″N 55°57′16″E
- Country: Iran
- Province: Hormozgan
- County: Khamir
- District: Central
- Rural District: Keshar

Population (2016)
  - Total: 2,578
- Time zone: UTC+3:30 (IRST)

Keshar-e Bala (Persian: كشاربالا) (Note: Also romanized as Kashār-e Bālā and Keshār-e Bālā; also known as Kashar ‘Olya, Kashār-e ‘Olyā, and Kishār Bāla) is a village in, and the capital of, Keshar Rural District of the Central District of Khamir County, Hormozgan province, Iran.

== Demographics ==
=== Population ===
At the time of the 2006 National Census, the village's population was 2,032 in 461 households, when it was in Kahurestan Rural District. The following census in 2011 counted 2,316 people in 554 households. The 2016 census measured the population of the village as 2,578 people in 745 households.

After the census, Keshar-e Bala was transferred to Keshar Rural District created in the Central District.
