= Kiru =

Kiru may refer to:

- Kill!, a 1968 Japanese film directed by Kihachi Okamoto
- Kiru, Iran
- Kiru, Hormozgan (disambiguation), Iran
- Kiru, Kenya
- Kiru, Nigeria
- Kiru (Tanzanian ward), Babati Rural District, Manyara Region, Tanzania
