= Churi, Hormozgan =

Churi چوري
- Village
- Location within Iran
- Coordinates: 27°22′42″N 55°48′47″E
- Country: Iran
- Province: Hormozgan
- County: Khamir
- Bakhsh: Central
- Rural District: Kohurestan

Population (2006)
  - Total: 53
- Time zone: UTC+3:30 (IRST)
  - Summer (DST): UTC+4:30 (IRDT)

Churi (Persian: چوري, also Romanized as Chūrī) is a village in Kohurestan Rural District, in the Central District of Khamir County, Hormozgan Province, Iran. At the 2006 census, its population was 53, in 9 families.
