= Keshar-e Sargap =

Keshar-e Sargap كشارسرگپ
- Village
- Location within Iran
- Coordinates: 27°14′46″N 55°55′46″E
- Country: Iran
- Province: Hormozgan
- County: Khamir
- Bakhsh: Central
- Rural District: Kohurestan

Population (2006)
  - Total: 417
- Time zone: UTC+3:30 (IRST)
  - Summer (DST): UTC+4:30 (IRDT)

Keshar-e Sargap (Persian: كشارسرگپ, also Romanized as Keshār-e Sargap; also known as Keshr-e Sargab) is a village in Kohurestan Rural District, in the Central District of Khamir County, Hormozgan Province, Iran. At the 2006 census, its population was 417, in 105 families.
