= Gevin, Khamir =

Gevin گوين
- Village
- Location within Iran
- Coordinates: 27°24′34″N 55°20′37″E
- Country: Iran
- Province: Hormozgan
- County: Khamir
- Bakhsh: Ruydar
- Rural District: Rudbar

Population (2006)
  - Total: 1,021
- Time zone: UTC+3:30 (IRST)
  - Summer (DST): UTC+4:30 (IRDT)

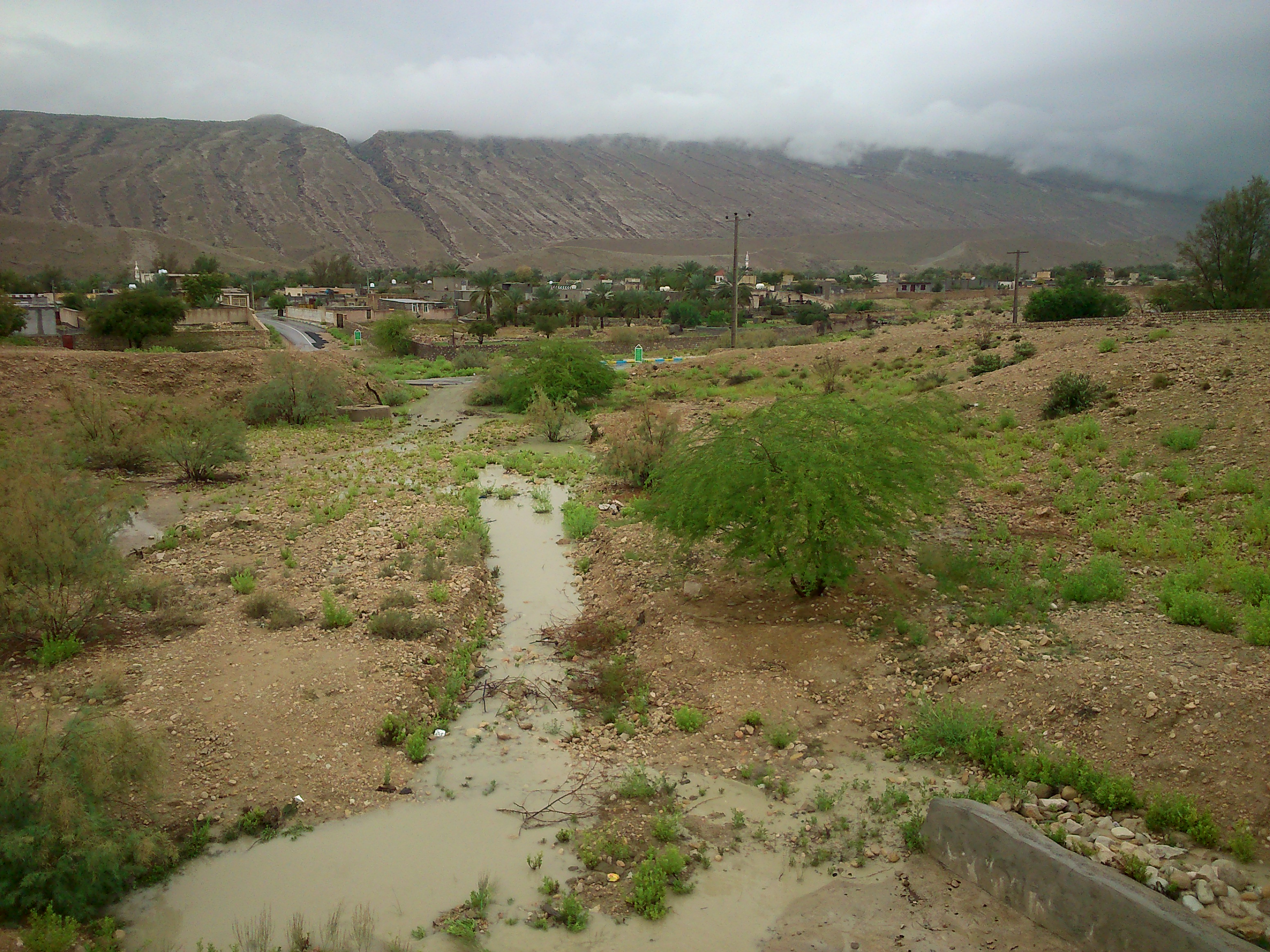
Gevin village

Gevin (Persian: گوين, also Romanized as Gevīn and Geveyn) is a village in Rudbar Rural District, Ruydar District, Khamir County, Hormozgan Province, Iran. At the 2006 census, its population was 1,021, in 250 families.
