= Baqiabad =

Baqiabad (Persian: باقي اباد) may refer to:

- Baqiabad, Delhi, village in North East Delhi district of Delhi, India
- Baqiabad, Hormozgan, village in Khamir County, Hormozgan Province, Iran
- Baqiabad, Yazd, village in Yazd Province, Iran
