= Baqiabad, Hormozgan =

Baqiabad باقي اباد
- Village
- Location within Iran
- Coordinates: 26°59′50″N 55°39′23″E
- Country: Iran
- Province: Hormozgan
- County: Khamir
- Bakhsh: Central
- Rural District: Khamir

Population (2006)
  - Total: 50
- Time zone: UTC+3:30 (IRST)
  - Summer (DST): UTC+4:30 (IRDT)

Baqiabad (Persian: باقي اباد, also Romanized as Bāqīābād; also known as Bākīābād) is a village in Khamir Rural District, in the Central District of Khamir County, Hormozgan Province, Iran. At the 2006 census, its population was 50, in 12 families.
