= Keshar-e Dustani =

Keshar-e Dustani كشاردوستاني
- Village
- Location within Iran
- Coordinates: 27°15′08″N 55°56′33″E
- Country: Iran
- Province: Hormozgan
- County: Khamir
- Bakhsh: Central
- Rural District: Kohurestan

Population (2006)
  - Total: 338
- Time zone: UTC+3:30 (IRST)
  - Summer (DST): UTC+4:30 (IRDT)

Keshar-e Dustani (Persian: كشاردوستاني, also Romanized as Keshār-e Dūstānī) is a village in Kohurestan Rural District, in the Central District of Khamir County, Hormozgan Province, Iran. At the 2006 census, its population was 338, in 80 families.
