= Keshar-e Chemerdan =

Keshar-e Chemerdan كشارچمردان
- Village
- Location within Iran
- Coordinates: 27°15′05″N 55°58′24″E
- Country: Iran
- Province: Hormozgan
- County: Khamir
- Bakhsh: Central
- Rural District: Kohurestan

Population (2006)
  - Total: 525
- Time zone: UTC+3:30 (IRST)
  - Summer (DST): UTC+4:30 (IRDT)

Keshar-e Chemerdan (Persian: كشارچمردان, also Romanized as Keshār-e Chemerdān) is a village in Kohurestan Rural District, in the Central District of Khamir County, Hormozgan Province, Iran. At the 2006 census, its population was 525, in 105 families.
