= Parkan, Iran =

Parkan (Persian: پركان) in Iran may refer to:

- Parkan, Kerman
- Parkan, Yazd
- Parkan-e Al-e Musa
- Parkan-e Gishu

== See also ==
- Purkan (disambiguation)
