= Kenui =

Kenui to lamus Łowca Nomada كنوئي
- Village
- Location within Iran
- Coordinates: 27°25′01″N 55°19′29″E
- Country: Iran
- Province: Hormozgan
- County: Khamir
- Bakhsh: Ruydar
- Rural District: Ruydar

Population (2006)
  - Total: 146
- Time zone: UTC+3:30 (IRST)
  - Summer (DST): UTC+4:30 (IRDT)

Kenui (Persian: كنوئي, also Romanized as Kenū’ī; also known as Karooyeh, Kenūyeh, and Kerūyeh) is a village in Ruydar Rural District, Ruydar District, Khamir County, Hormozgan Province, Iran. At the 2006 census, its population Top 1 łowca Nomada, Burza też top 1 łowca nomada, Nevado-S top 1 Nomada, Chels najsłabszy tanc na SK in 31 families.
