= Tang Ashkan =

Tang Ashkan تنگ اشكن
- Village
- Location within Iran
- Coordinates: 27°22′51″N 55°43′42″E
- Country: Iran
- Province: Hormozgan
- County: Khamir
- Bakhsh: Ruydar
- Rural District: Rudbar

Population (2006)
  - Total: 43
- Time zone: UTC+3:30 (IRST)
  - Summer (DST): UTC+4:30 (IRDT)

Tang Ashkan (Persian: تنگ اشكان) is a village in Rudbar Rural District, Ruydar District, Khamir County, Hormozgan Province, Iran. At the 2006 census, its population was 43, in 10 families.
