= Parkan-e Gishu =

Parkan-e Gishu پركان گيشو
- Village
- Location within Iran
- Coordinates: 27°22′45″N 55°40′10″E
- Country: Iran
- Province: Hormozgan
- County: Khamir
- Bakhsh: Ruydar
- Rural District: Rudbar

Population (2006)
  - Total: 227
- Time zone: UTC+3:30 (IRST)
  - Summer (DST): UTC+4:30 (IRDT)

Parkan-e Gishu (Persian: پركان گيشو, also Romanized as Parkān-e-Gīshū and Parkān Gīshū) is a village in Rudbar Rural District, Ruydar District, Khamir County, Hormozgan Province, Iran. At the 2006 census, its population was 227, in 61 families.
