= Parkan-e Al-e Musa =

Parkan-e Al-e Musa پركان ال موسي
- Village
- Location within Iran
- Coordinates: 27°27′34″N 55°36′24″E
- Country: Iran
- Province: Hormozgan
- County: Khamir
- Bakhsh: Ruydar
- Rural District: Rudbar

Population (2006)
  - Total: 120
- Time zone: UTC+3:30 (IRST)
  - Summer (DST): UTC+4:30 (IRDT)

Parkan-e Al-e Musa (Persian: پركان ال موسي, also Romanized as Parkān-e Āl-e Mūsá) is a village in Rudbar Rural District, Ruydar District, Khamir County, Hormozgan Province, Iran. At the 2006 census, its population was 120, in 27 families.
