= Tahlu, Khamir =

Tahlu تهلو
- Village
- Location within Iran
- Coordinates: 27°13′48″N 55°49′35″E
- Country: Iran
- Province: Hormozgan
- County: Khamir
- Bakhsh: Central
- Rural District: Kahurestan District

Population (2006)
  - Total: 843
- Time zone: UTC+3:30 (IRST)
  - Summer (DST): UTC+4:30 (IRDT)

Tahlu (Persian: تهلو, also Romanized as Tahlū) is a village in Kohurestan District, Khamir County, Hormozgan Province, Iran. At the 2006 census, its population was 843, in 201 families.
