= Maru, Hormozgan =

Maru مارو
- Village
- Location within Iran
- Coordinates: 27°22′47″N 55°49′46″E
- Country: Iran
- Province: Hormozgan
- County: Khamir
- Bakhsh: Central
- Rural District: Kohurestan

Population (2006)
  - Total: 269
- Time zone: UTC+3:30 (IRST)
  - Summer (DST): UTC+4:30 (IRDT)

Maru (Persian: مارو, also Romanized as Mārū) is a village in Kohurestan Rural District, in the Central District of Khamir County, Hormozgan Province, Iran. At the 2006 census, its population was 269, in 61 families.
