= Latidan Rural District =

Rural district in Hormozgan province, Iran

Latidan Rural District Persian: دهستان لاتیدان
- Rural District
- Location within Iran
- Coordinates: 27°13′59″N 55°44′44″E
- Country: Iran
- Province: Hormozgan
- County: Khamir
- District: Kahurestan
- Capital: Nimeh Kar
- Time zone: UTC+3:30 (IRST)

Latidan Rural District (Persian: دهستان لاتیدان) is in Kahurestan District of Khamir County, Hormozgan province, Iran. Its capital is the village of Nimeh Kar, whose population at the time of the 2016 National Census was 1,787 in 489 households.

After the census, Kahurestan Rural District was separated from the Central District in the formation of Kahurestan District, and Latidan Rural District was created in the new district.
