= Churi, Iran =

Churi (Persian: چوري) may refer to:

- Churi, Gilan
- Churi, Hormozgan
