= Keshar-e Zir =

Keshar-e Zir كشارزير
- Village
- Country: Iran
- Province: Hormozgan
- County: Khamir
- Bakhsh: Central
- Rural District: Kohurestan

Population (2006)
  - Total: 389
- Time zone: UTC+3:30 (IRST)
  - Summer (DST): UTC+4:30 (IRDT)

Keshar-e Zir (Persian: كشارزير, also Romanized as Keshār-e Zīr) is a village in Kohurestan Rural District, in the Central District of Khamir County, Hormozgan Province, Iran. At the 2006 census, its population was 389, in 81 families.
