= Pol-e Angur =

Neighborhood in Hormozgan province, Iran

Pol-e Angur Persian: پل انگور
- Neighborhood
- Location within Iran
- Coordinates: 27°00′04″N 55°43′47″E
- Country: Iran
- Province: Hormozgan
- County: Khamir
- District: Central
- City: Pol

Population (2006)
  - Total: 588
- Time zone: UTC+3:30 (IRST)

Pol-e Angur (Persian: پل انگور) (Note: Also romanized as Pol Angūr and Pol-e Angūr; also known as Angoorpol, Angūr-e Pahel, Pahal, Pahel, Pahel Angūr, Pol, and Pūhāl) is a neighborhood in the city of Pol in the Central District of Khamir County, Hormozgan province, Iran.

== Demographics ==
=== Population ===
At the time of the 2006 National Census, Pol-e Angur's population was 588 in 118 households, when it was a village in Khamir Rural District.

After the census, the village of Pol-e Sharqi merged with Pol-e Angur and was elevated to city status as Pol.
