= Khamir Castle =

Castle in Hormozgan Province, Iran

Khamir castle
- قلعه خمیر

General information
- Type: Castle
- Location: Bandar Khamir, Iran

Khamir castle (Persian: قلعه خمیر) is a historical castle located in Khamir County in Hormozgan Province, The longevity of this fortress dates back to the Qajar dynasty.
