= Tahlu =

Tahlu or Tahloo (Persian: تهلو) may refer to:

- Tahlu, Bandar Abbas
- Tahlu, Khamir
