= Shingu =

Shingu may refer to:

== Cities and places ==
=== Iran ===
Persian: شينگو - Shīngū

- Shingu, Iran, a village in Kohurestan Rural District, in the Central District of Khamir County, Hormozgan Province

=== Japan ===
Shingū (新宮, shingū)

- Shingū, Ehime (新宮村), a former village located in Uma District, Ehime Prefecture, now part of the city of Shikokuchūō
- Shingū, Fukuoka (新宮町), a town located in Kasuya District, Fukuoka Prefecture
- Shingū, Hyōgo (新宮町), a town located in Ibo District, Hyōgo Prefecture, now part of the city of Tatsuno
- Shingū Station, a railway station in Shingū, Wakayama Prefecture
- Shingū, Wakayama (新宮市), a city located in Wakayama Prefecture
- Shingū-Chūō Station, a railway station on the Kagoshima Main Line, in Shingū, Fukuoka

=== Pakistan ===
- Shingu Charpa, a mountain in the Hushe Region

== Entertainment ==
- Shingu: Secret of the Stellar Wars, anime series

== See also ==
- Singu (disambiguation)
