= Parkan =

Parkan may refer to:

- Parkan (series), video game series starting 1997
- Parkan, Iran (disambiguation), places in Iran
- Štúrovo, town in Slovakia
