= Karuiyeh =

Village in Hormozgan province, Iran

Karuiyeh Persian: كروئيه
- Village
- Location within Iran
- Coordinates: 27°25′43″N 55°27′23″E
- Country: Iran
- Province: Hormozgan
- County: Khamir
- District: Ruydar
- Rural District: Ruydar

Population (2016)
  - Total: 1,142
- Time zone: UTC+3:30 (IRST)

Karuiyeh (Persian: كروئيه) (Note: Also romanized as Karū‘īyeh and Kerūyeh; also known as Kīrū) is a village in Ruydar Rural District of Ruydar District, Khamir County, Hormozgan province, Iran.

== Demographics ==
=== Population ===
At the time of the 2006 National Census, the village's population was 1,167 in 318 households. The following census in 2011 counted 1,236 people in 326 households. The 2016 census measured the population of the village as 1,142 people in 351 households. It was the most populous village in its rural district.
