= Marow =

Marow may refer to:

- Marow Baronets
- Maru, Iran (disambiguation)
