= Maru, Iran =

Maru (Persian: مرو or مارو) may refer to:

- Maru, Hormozgan (مارو - Mārū)
- Maru, Lorestan (مرو - Marū)
- Maru, Zanjan (مرو - Marū)
