= Gishi =

Gishi (Persian: گيشي) may refer to:

- Gishi, Nagorno-Karabakh, Artsakh
- Geshi, Deyr, Iran
- Gishi, Hormozgan, Iran
- Gishi, Isfahan, Iran
