= Purkan =

Purkan (Persian: پوركان) may refer to:

- Purkan, Alborz
- Purkan, Kerman
- Purkan, Yazd

== See also ==
- Parkan, Iran (disambiguation)
- Purgan (disambiguation)
