= Keruyeh =

Keruyeh (Persian: كرويه) may refer to:

- Kenui
- Karuiyeh
