= Purgan =

Purgan (Persian: پورگان) may refer to:

- Purgan, Bushehr
- Purgan, Yazd

== See also ==
- Purkan (disambiguation)
