= Rudbar, Khamir =

Village in Hormozgan province, Iran

Rudbar Persian: رودبار
- Village
- Location within Iran
- Coordinates: 27°20′37″N 55°29′55″E
- Country: Iran
- Province: Hormozgan
- County: Khamir
- District: Ruydar
- Rural District: Rudbar

Population (2016)
  - Total: 1,677
- Time zone: UTC+3:30 (IRST)

Rudbar (Persian: رودبار) (Note: Also romanized as Rūdbār; also known as Ravīdar-e Soflá, Rūdar-e Bālā, and Rūdār-i-Bāla) is a village in, and the capital of, Rudbar Rural District of Ruydar District, Khamir County, Hormozgan province, Iran.

== Demographics ==
=== Population ===
At the time of the 2006 National Census, the village's population was 1,259 in 258 households. The following census in 2011 counted 1,566 people in 403 households. The 2016 census measured the population of the village as 1,677 people in 504 households. It was the most populous village in its rural district.
