= Ashcan =

Ashcan may refer to:

- Ashcan (waste), a waste container
- Camp Ashcan, prisoner-of-war camp for prominent Nazis
- Ashcan (weapon), an anti-submarine weapon
- Ashcan School, a realist artistic movement
- Ashcan comic, a comic book created solely to establish trademarks on potential titles and not intended for sale

== See also ==
- Ashkan (disambiguation)
