= Singu (disambiguation) =

Singu may refer to:

- Singu, town in the Mandalay Division of central Myanmar
- Singu Chuli (Fluted Peak), one of the trekking peaks in the Nepali Himalaya range
- Singu Plateau, volcanic plateau located in central Burma
- Singu Township, township of Pyinoolwin District, Mandalay Division, Myanmar
- Singu Min (1756–1782), the fourth king of the Konbaung dynasty of Myanmar

== See also ==
- Shingu
