= Keshar Rural District =

Rural district in Hormozgan province, Iran

Keshar Rural District Persian: دهستان کشار
- Rural District
- Location within Iran
- Coordinates: 27°16′08″N 55°57′16″E
- Country: Iran
- Province: Hormozgan
- County: Khamir
- District: Central
- Capital: Keshar-e Bala
- Time zone: UTC+3:30 (IRST)

Keshar Rural District (Persian: دهستان کشار) is in the Central District of Khamir County, Hormozgan province, Iran. Its capital is the village of Keshar-e Bala, whose population at the time of the 2016 National Census was 2,578 in 745 households.

== History ==
Keshar Rural District was established in the Central District after the 2016 census.
