= Ashkan-e Olya =

Ashkan-e Olya اشكان عليا
- Village
- Location within Iran
- Coordinates: 36°01′16″N 45°21′54″E
- Country: Iran
- Province: West Azerbaijan
- County: Sardasht
- Bakhsh: Central
- Rural District: Alan

Population (2006)
  - Total: 89
- Time zone: UTC+3:30 (IRST)
  - Summer (DST): UTC+4:30 (IRDT)

Ashkan-e Olya (Persian: اشكان عليا, also Romanized as Ashkān-e ‘Olyā; also known as Ashkān-e Bālā) is a village in Alan Rural District, in the Central District of Sardasht County, West Azerbaijan Province, Iran. At the 2006 census, its population was 89, in 24 families.
