= Bandar Khamir =

City in Hormozgan province, Iran

Bandar Khamir Persian: بندر خمير
- City
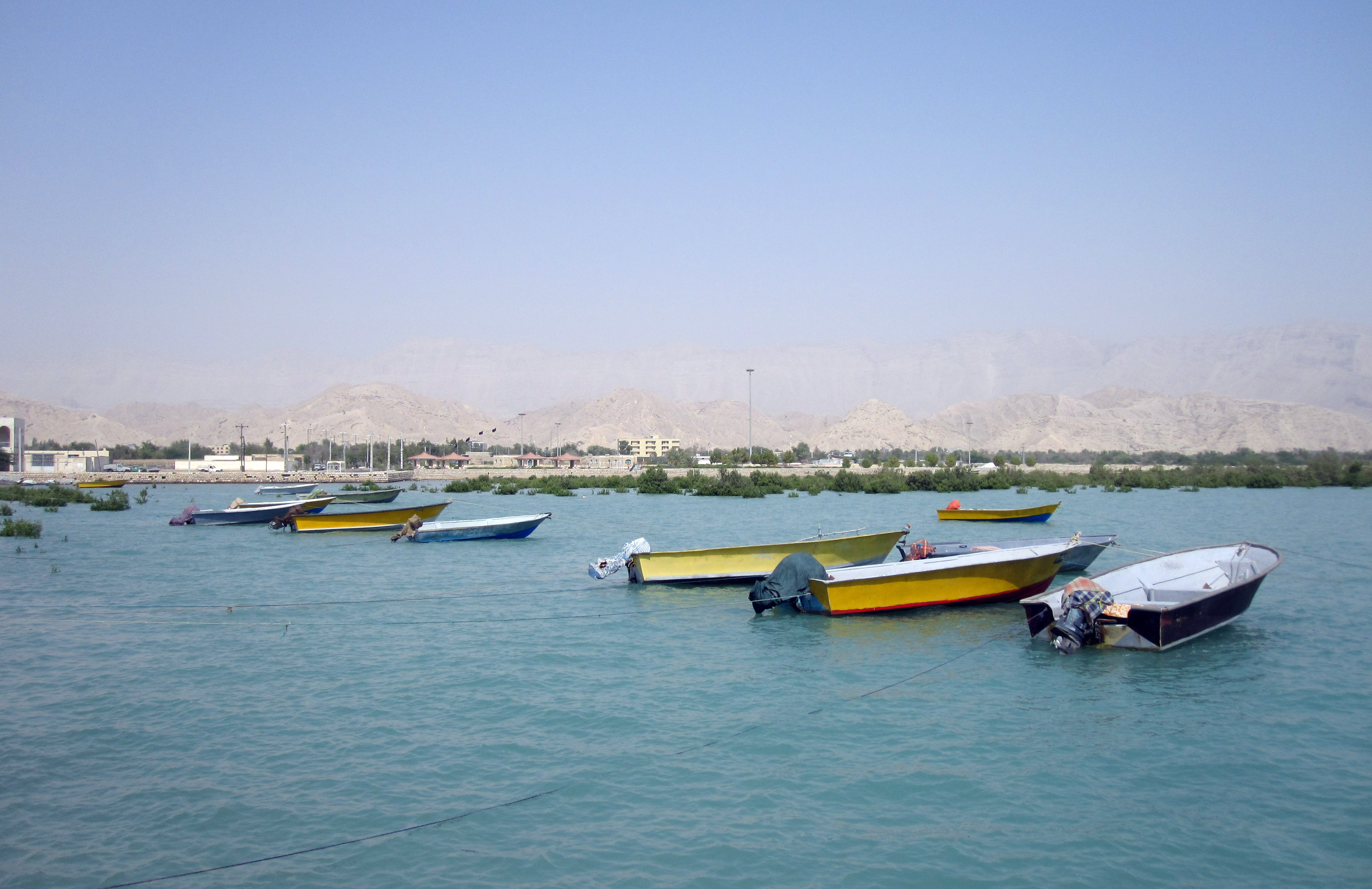
- Bandar Khamir beach

- Location within Iran
- Coordinates: 26°57′12″N 55°35′07″E
- Country: Iran
- Province: Hormozgan
- County: Khamir
- District: Central

Population (2016)
  - Total: 15,320
- Time zone: UTC+3:30 (IRST)
- Website: en.khamirtourism.ir

Bandar Khamir (Persian: بندر خمير) (Note: Also romanized as Bandar Khamīr and Bandar-e Khamīr; also known as Khamīr or Xamir) is a port city on the shores of the Persian Gulf in the Central District of Khamir County, Hormozgan province, Iran, serving as capital of both the county and the district.

== Demographics ==
=== Population ===
At the time of the 2006 National Census, the city's population was 11,307 in 2,441 households. The following census in 2011 counted 14,617 people in 3,453 households. The 2016 census measured the population of the city as 15,320 people in 4,161 households.

== Overview ==
This historic port is the largest city near Khoorkhooran wetland, the largest in West Asia and with the widest mangrove forests in Iran. Bandar Khamir has the longest wetland shore in Iran, which due to years of environmental activities and high participation of people in the preservation and development of this wetland, the city was introduced as the first national wetland city in Iran and became World Wetland City in 2022.

This city was selected as a UNESCO Learning City in 2021 due to its extensive activities and education to different segments of the population. This city is now recognized in Iran and the world as one of the models of sustainable development based on people's participation.

In addition to mangrove forests and wetlands, this city has unique natural attractions such as hot springs, domes, salt ponds and landmarks such as the historic castle and Latidan bridge which is the longest historical bridge in Iran.

The rich culture of people is crystallized through coexistence with wetlands, sea and historical and maritime connections with other countries of the world from India to Africa and Arab countries in various cases such as history, music, clothes, food, language, architecture and many more, these features attract tourists so much that it is unlikely that after visiting this city and meeting these people, they were not impressed by their hospitality, culture and humanity.

Bandar Khamir includes five villages named Upper Lashtaghān, Lower Lashtaghān, Kandāl, Baghi Abād, and Chah Sahāri.
