= Maru, Lorestan =

Maru مرو
- Village
- Location within Iran
- Coordinates: 33°59′07″N 48°50′44″E
- Country: Iran
- Province: Lorestan
- County: Borujerd
- Bakhsh: Central
- Rural District: Darreh Seydi

Population (2006)
  - Total: 184
- Time zone: UTC+3:30 (IRST)
  - Summer (DST): UTC+4:30 (IRDT)

Maru (Persian: مرو, also Romanized as Marū, Marow, and Marv) is a village in Darreh Seydi Rural District, in the Central District of Borujerd County, Lorestan Province, Iran. At the 2006 census, its population was 184, in 49 families.
