= Paheli =

Paheli (lit. 'riddle') may refer to:

- Paheli (1977 film), an Indian film directed by Prashant Nanda
- Paheli (2005 film), an Indian film directed by Amol Palekar

== See also ==
- Ek Paheli, a 1971 Indian film by Naresh Kumar
- Ek Paheli Leela, a 2015 Indian film by Bobby Khan
