= Gishu, Kerman =

Gishu گيشو
- Village
- Country: Iran
- Province: Kerman
- County: Faryab
- Bakhsh: Central
- Rural District: Hur

Population (2006)
  - Total: 20
- Time zone: UTC+3:30 (IRST)
  - Summer (DST): UTC+4:30 (IRDT)

Gishu (Persian: گيشو, also Romanized as Gīshū) is a village located in Hur Rural District, within the Central District of Faryab County, Kerman Province, Iran. According to the 2006 census, the village had a population of 20 people, in four families.
