= Bandar Pol =

City in Hormozgan province, Iran

Bandar Pol Persian: بندر پل
- City
- Location within Iran
- Coordinates: 27°00′30″N 55°44′18″E
- Country: Iran
- Province: Hormozgan
- County: Khamir
- District: Central

Population (2016)
  - Total: 5,943
- Time zone: UTC+3:30 (IRST)
- Website: https://bandarpol.ir

Bandar Pol (Persian: بندر پل) (Note: Formerly the village of Pol-e Sharqi (پل شرقي), also known as Bandar-e Pol (بندر پل) and Pohl) is a city in the Central District of Khamir County, Hormozgan province, Iran. The village of Pol-e Sharqi merged with the village of Pol-e Angur to become the city of Pol. As a village, it was the capital of Khamir Rural District until its capital was transferred to the village of Dargur.

In the context of the 2026 Iran war, the pier was hit by an airstrike on March 29, 2026, killing five people and injuring four.

== Demographics ==
=== Population ===
At the time of the 2006 National Census, the population (as the village of Pol-e Sharqi) was 4,585 in 901 households, when it was in Khamir Rural District. The following census in 2011 counted 5,604 people in 1,438 households. The 2016 census measured the population of the village as 5,943 people in 1,692 households. It was the most populous village in its rural district.

After the 2016 census, the village of Pol-e Sharqi merged with the village of Pol-e Angur to become the city of Pol.
