= Kiru, Iran =

Kiru کيرو
- Village
- Location within Iran
- Coordinates: 33°07′13″N 49°21′58″E
- Country: Iran
- Province: Lorestan
- County: Aligudarz
- Bakhsh: Zaz and Mahru
- Rural District: Zaz-e Sharqi

Population (2006)
  - Total: 207
- Time zone: UTC+3:30 (IRST)
  - Summer (DST): UTC+4:30 (IRDT)

Kiru (Persian: کيرو, also Romanized as Kīrū; also known as Kaguran (Persian: کيگوران), also Romanized as Kagūrān and Kīgūrān) is a village in Zaz-e Sharqi Rural District, Zaz and Mahru District, Aligudarz County, Lorestan Province, Iran. At the 2006 census, its population was 207, in 33 families.
