= Ruydar =

City in Hormozgan province, Iran

Ruydar Persian: رويدر
- City
- Location within Iran
- Coordinates: 27°28′02″N 55°25′09″E
- Country: Iran
- Province: Hormozgan
- County: Khamir
- District: Ruydar

Population (2016)
  - Total: 6,558
- Time zone: UTC+3:30 (IRST)

Ruydar (Persian: رويدر) (Note: Also romanized as Rooydar, Rūydar, and Rūy-e Dar; also known as Rowdar) is a city in, and the capital of, Ruydar District of Khamir County, Hormozgan province, Iran. It also serves as the administrative center for Ruydar Rural District.

== Demographics ==
=== Population ===
At the time of the 2006 National Census, Ruydar's population was 5,470 in 1,236 households, when it was a village in Ruydar Rural District. The following census in 2011 counted 6,034 people in 1,526 households, by which time the village had been elevated to the status of a city. The 2016 census measured the population of the city as 6,558 people in 1,896 households.
