= Ashkan, Hormozgan =

Ashkan اشكان
- Village
- Location within Iran
- Coordinates: 26°39′00″N 57°53′00″E
- Country: Iran
- Province: Hormozgan
- County: Bashagard
- Bakhsh: Gowharan
- Rural District: Gowharan

Population (2006)
  - Total: 223
- Time zone: UTC+3:30 (IRST)
  - Summer (DST): UTC+4:30 (IRDT)

Ashkan (Persian: اشكان, also Romanized as Ashkān) is a village in Gowharan Rural District, Gowharan District, Bashagard County, Hormozgan Province, Iran. At the 2006 census, its population was 223, in 45 families.
