= Baqiabad, Yazd =

Baqiabad باقي اباد
- Village
- Location within Iran
- Coordinates: 31°37′04″N 54°10′48″E
- Country: Iran
- Province: Yazd
- County: Taft
- Bakhsh: Central
- Rural District: Shirkuh

Population (2006)
  - Total: 108
- Time zone: UTC+3:30 (IRST)
  - Summer (DST): UTC+4:30 (IRDT)

Baqiabad (Persian: باقي اباد, romanized: Bāqīābād; also known as Baghi Abad) is a village in Shirkuh Rural District, in the Central District of Taft County, Yazd Province, Iran. In 2006 census, its population was 108, in 37 families.
