= Pargan =

Pargan پرگان
- Village
- Location within Iran
- Coordinates: 31°41′10″N 56°06′45″E
- Country: Iran
- Province: Yazd
- County: Behabad
- Bakhsh: Central
- Rural District: Banestan

Population (2006)
  - Total: 33
- Time zone: UTC+3:30 (IRST)
  - Summer (DST): UTC+4:30 (IRDT)

Pargan (Persian: پرگان, also Romanized as Pargān; also known as Parkān, Poorgan, Por Kon, Porūkān, Pūrgān, and Pūrkān) is a village in Banestan Rural District, in the Central District of Behabad County, Yazd Province, Iran. At the 2006 census, its population was 33, in 7 families.
