= Kahurestan District =

District in Hormozgan province, Iran

Kahurestan District Persian: بخش کهورستان
- District
- Location within Iran
- Coordinates: 27°13′37″N 55°21′44″E
- Country: Iran
- Province: Hormozgan
- County: Khamir
- Capital: Kahurestan
- Time zone: UTC+3:30 (IRST)

Kahurestan District (Persian: بخش کهورستان) (Note: Kahur (Persian: کهور) means mesquite in English) is in Khamir County, Hormozgan province, Iran. Its capital is the village of Kahurestan, whose population at the time of the 2016 National Census was 3,418 in 1,036 households.

== History ==
After the census, Kahurestan Rural District was separated from the Central District in the formation of Kahurestan District.

== Demographics ==
=== Administrative divisions ===
Kahurestan District
Administrative Divisions
Kahurestan RD
Latidan RD
RD = Rural District
