= Rudbar Rural District (Khamir County) =

Rural district in Hormozgan province, Iran

Rudbar Rural District Persian: دهستان رودبار
- Rural District
- Location within Iran
- Coordinates: 27°23′N 55°34′E
- Country: Iran
- Province: Hormozgan
- County: Khamir
- District: Ruydar
- Capital: Rudbar

Population (2016)
  - Total: 4,024
- Time zone: UTC+3:30 (IRST)

Rudbar Rural District (Persian: دهستان رودبار) is in Ruydar District of Khamir County, Hormozgan province, Iran. Its capital is the village of Rudbar.

== Demographics ==
=== Population ===
At the time of the 2006 National Census, the rural district's population was 3,079 in 701 households. There were 3,836 inhabitants in 1,012 households at the following census of 2011. The 2016 census measured the population of the rural district as 4,024 in 1,233 households. The most populous of its 18 villages was Rudbar, with 1,677 people.
