= Ruydar Rural District =

Rural district in Hormozgan province, Iran

Ruydar Rural District Persian: دهستان رویدر
- Rural District
- Location within Iran
- Coordinates: 27°24′42″N 55°18′49″E
- Country: Iran
- Province: Hormozgan
- County: Khamir
- District: Ruydar
- Capital: Ruydar

Population (2016)
  - Total: 3,745
- Time zone: UTC+3:30 (IRST)

Ruydar Rural District (Persian: دهستان رویدر) is in Ruydar District of Khamir County, Hormozgan province, Iran. It is administered from the city of Ruydar.

== Demographics ==
=== Population ===
At the time of the 2006 National Census, the rural district's population was 8,549 in 1,974 households. There were 3,589 inhabitants in 974 households at the following census of 2011. The 2016 census measured the population of the rural district as 3,745 in 1,185 households. The most populous of its 22 villages was Karuiyeh, with 1,142 people.
