= Khamir Rural District =

Rural district in Hormozgan province, Iran

Khamir Rural District Persian: دهستان خمیر
- Rural District
- Location within Iran
- Coordinates: 27°03′11″N 55°38′27″E
- Country: Iran
- Province: Hormozgan
- County: Khamir
- District: Central
- Capital: Dargur

Population (2016)
  - Total: 10,602
- Time zone: UTC+3:30 (IRST)

Khamir Rural District (Persian: دهستان خمیر) is in the Central District of Khamir County, Hormozgan province, Iran. Its capital is the village of Dargur. The previous capital of the rural district was the village of Pol, now a city.

== Demographics ==
=== Population ===
At the time of the 2006 National Census, the rural district's population was 11,648 in 2,411 households. There were 9,641 inhabitants in 2,564 households at the following census of 2011. The 2016 census measured the population of the rural district as 10,602 in 3,035 households. The most populous of its 16 villages was Pol-e Sharqi (now the city of Pol), with 5,943 people.
