= Ruydar District =

District in Hormozgan province, Iran

Ruydar District Persian: بخش رویدر
- District
- Location within Iran
- Coordinates: 27°23′40″N 55°29′32″E
- Country: Iran
- Province: Hormozgan
- County: Khamir
- Capital: Ruydar

Population (2016)
  - Total: 14,327
- Time zone: UTC+3:30 (IRST)

Ruydar District (Persian: بخش رویدر) is in Khamir County, Hormozgan province, Iran. Its capital is the city of Ruydar.

== History ==
After the 2006 National Census, the village Ruydar was elevated to the status of a city.

== Demographics ==
=== Population ===
At the time of the 2006 census, the district's population was 11,628 in 2,675 households. The following census in 2011 counted 13,459 people in 3,512 households. The 2016 census measured the population of the district as 14,327 inhabitants in 4,314 households.

=== Administrative divisions ===
Ruydar District Population
Administrative Divisions	2006	2011	2016
Rudbar RD	3,079	3,836	4,024
Ruydar RD	8,549	3,589	3,745
Ruydar (city)		6,034	6,558
Total	11,628	13,459	14,327
RD = Rural District
