= Kahurestan Rural District =

Rural district in Hormozgan province, Iran

Kahurestan Rural District Persian: دهستان کهورستان
- Rural District
- Location within Iran
- Coordinates: 27°18′24″N 55°10′31″E
- Country: Iran
- Province: Hormozgan
- County: Khamir
- District: Kahurestan
- Capital: Jeyhun

Population (2016)
  - Total: 15,899
- Time zone: UTC+3:30 (IRST)

Kahurestan Rural District (Persian: دهستان کهورستان) is in Kahurestan District of Khamir County, Hormozgan province, Iran. Its capital is the village of Jeyhun. The previous capital of the rural district was the village of Kahurestan.

== Demographics ==
=== Population ===
At the time of the 2006 National Census, the rural district's population (as a part of the Central District) was 12,962 in 2,793 households. There were 14,861 inhabitants in 3,651 households at the following census of 2011. The 2016 census measured the population of the rural district as 15,899 in 4,561 households. The most populous of its 45 villages was Kahurestan, with 3,418 people.

After the census, the rural district was separated from the district in the formation of Kahurestan District.
