= Central District (Khamir County) =

District in Hormozgan province, Iran

Central District (Khamir County) Persian: بخش مرکزی شهرستان خمیر
- District
- Location within Iran
- Coordinates: 27°10′22″N 55°42′45″E
- Country: Iran
- Province: Hormozgan
- County: Khamir
- Capital: Bandar Khamir

Population (2016)
  - Total: 41,821
- Time zone: UTC+3:30 (IRST)

The Central District of Khamir County (Persian: بخش مرکزی شهرستان خمیر) is in Hormozgan province, Iran. Its capital is the city of Bandar Khamir.

== History ==
After the 2016 National Census, two villages merged to form the new city of Pol. Keshar Rural District was created in the district, and Kahurestan Rural District was separated from it in the establishment of Kahurestan District.

== Demographics ==
=== Population ===
At the time of the 2006 census, the district's population was 35,917 in 7,645 households. The following census in 2011 counted 39,119 people in 9,668 households. The 2016 census measured the population of the district as 41,821 inhabitants in 11,757 households.

=== Administrative divisions ===
Central District (Khamir County) Population
Administrative Divisions	2006	2011	2016
Keshar RD (Note: Established after the 2016 census)			
Khamir RD	11,648	9,641	10,602
Kahurestan RD (Note: Became a part of Kahurestan District)	12,962	14,861	15,899
Bandar Khamir (city)	11,307	14,617	15,320
Pol (city) (Note: Became a city after the 2016 census)			
Total	35,917	39,119	41,821
RD = Rural District
