= Khamir County =

County in Hormozgan province, Iran

Khamir County Persian: شهرستان خمیر
- County
- Location of Khamir County in Hormozgan province (left, purple)

- Location of Hormozgan province in Iran
- Coordinates: 27°14′N 55°28′E
- Country: Iran
- Province: Hormozgan
- Capital: Bandar Khamir
- Districts: Central, Kahurestan, Ruydar

Area
  - Total: 3,925 km^{2} (1,515 sq mi)

Population (2016)
  - Total: 56,148
  - Density: 14.31/km^{2} (37.05/sq mi)
- Time zone: UTC+3:30 (IRST)

Khamir County (Persian: شهرستان خمیر) is in Hormozgan province, Iran. Its capital is the port city Bandar Khamir (Persian: بندر خمير).

== History ==
After the 2006 National Census, the village Ruydar was elevated to the status of a city, and after the 2016 census, two villages merged to form the new city of Pol. Keshar Rural District was created in the Central District, and Kahurestan Rural District was separated from it in the establishment of Kahurestan District, including the new Latidan Rural District.

== Demographics ==
=== Population ===
At the time of the 2006 census, the county's population was 47,545 in 10,320 households. The following census in 2011 counted 52,968 people in 13,245 households. The 2016 census measured the population of the county as 56,148 in 16,071 households.

=== Administrative divisions ===
Khamir County's population history and administrative structure over three consecutive censuses are shown in the following table.

Khamir County Population
| Administrative Divisions | 2006 | 2011 | 2016 |
|---|---|---|---|
| Central District | 35,917 | 39,119 | 41,821 |
| Keshar RD (Note: Established after the 2016 census) | | | |
| Khamir RD | 11,648 | 9,641 | 10,602 |
| Kahurestan RD | 12,962 | 14,861 | 15,899 |
| Bandar Khamir (city) | 11,307 | 14,617 | 15,320 |
| Pol (city) (Note: Merger of two villages; became a city after the 2016 census) | | | |
| Kahurestan District | | | |
| Kahurestan RD | | | |
| Latidan RD | | | |
| Ruydar District | 11,628 | 13,459 | 14,327 |
| Rudbar RD | 3,079 | 3,836 | 4,024 |
| Ruydar RD | 8,549 | 3,589 | 3,745 |
| Ruydar (city) | | 6,034 | 6,558 |
| Total | 47,545 | 52,968 | 56,148 |
RD = Rural District

== See also ==
Media related to Khamir County at Wikimedia Commons
