= Saint Catherine's Monastery =

Greek Orthodox monastery in Sinai

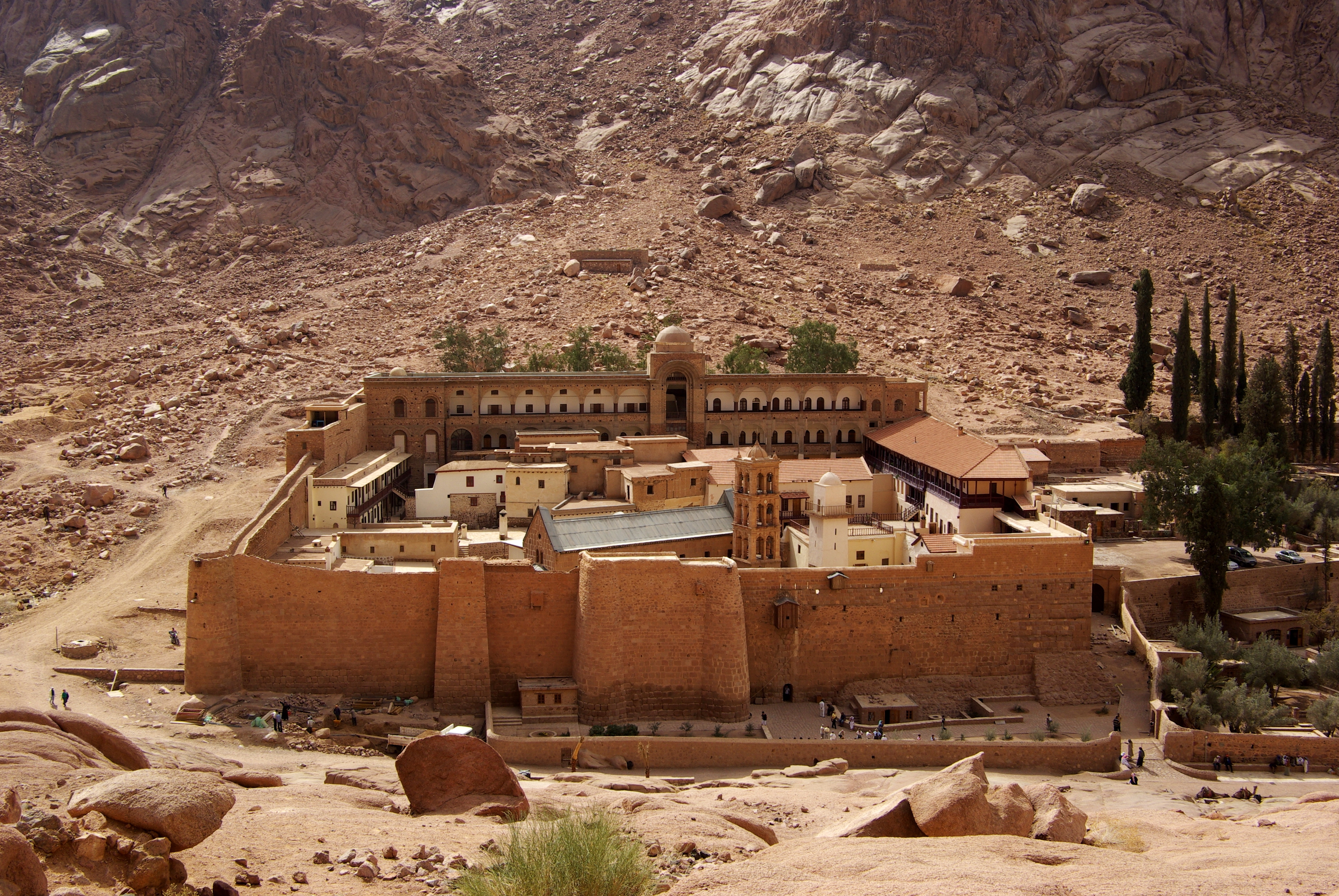
- General view of Saint Catherine's Monastery, looking down from Mount Sinai

- Location within the Sinai Peninsula Location within Egypt

Monastery information
- Full name: Sacred Autonomous Royal Monastery of Saint Catherine of the Holy and God-Trodden Mount Sinai; Greek: Ιερά Αυτόνομος Βασιλική Μονή Αγίας Αικατερίνης του Αγίου και Θεοβαδίστου Όρους Σινά
- Other names: Monastery of Saint Katherine; Moni tis Ayas Ekaterinis
- Order: Church of Sinai
- Denomination: Greek Orthodox Church
- Established: AD 565

People
- Founder: Justinian I

Site
- Location: Saint Catherine, South Sinai Governorate, Egypt
- Country: Egypt
- Coordinates: 28°33′20″N 33°58′34″E
- Visible remains: Catherine of Alexandria
- Website: www.sinaimonastery.com

UNESCO World Heritage Site
- Official name: Saint Catherine Area
- Type: Cultural
- Criteria: i, iii, iv, vi
- Designated: 2002 (26th session)
- Reference no.: 954
- Region: Arab States

Saint Catherine's Monastery (Arabic: دير القدّيسة كاترين Dayr al-Qiddīsa Katrīn, Greek: Ιερά Μονή Αγίας Αικατερίνης Όρους Σινά, romanized: Iërá Moní Ayías Ekaterínis Órus Siná (Note: Koine Greek: Μονὴ τῆς Ἁγίας Αἰκατερίνης)), officially the Sacred Autonomous Royal Monastery of Saint Catherine of the Holy and God-Trodden Mount Sinai, is a Christian monastery located in the Sinai Peninsula of Egypt. Located at the foot of Mount Sinai, it was built between 548 and 565, and is the world's oldest continuously inhabited Christian monastery.

The monastery was built by order of the Byzantine emperor Justinian I, enclosing what is claimed to be the burning bush seen by Moses. Centuries later, the purported body of Catherine of Alexandria, said to have been found in the area, was taken to the monastery; Catherine's relics turned it into an important Christian pilgrimage, and the monastery was eventually renamed after the saint.

Controlled by the autonomous Church of Sinai, which is part of the wider Greek Orthodox Church, the monastery became a World Heritage Site in 2002 for its unique importance to the three major Abrahamic religions: Judaism, Christianity, and Islam. The monastery includes a Fatimid mosque built in 1106 AD that is still preserved.

The monastery library holds unique and rare works, such as the Codex Sinaiticus and the Syriac Sinaiticus, as well as a collection of early Christian icons, including the earliest known depiction of Christ Pantocrator.

Saint Catherine's has as its backdrop the three mountains it lies near: Willow Peak (possibly the biblical Mount Horeb, peak c.1 km (0.62 mi) west); Jebel Arrenziyeb, peak c. 1km south; and Mount Sinai (locally, Jabal Musa, by tradition identified with the biblical Mount Sinai; peak c. 2 km (1.2 mi) south).

== Christian traditions ==
The monastery was built around the site traditionally considered to be the place of the burning bush seen by the Hebrew prophet Moses. Saint Catherine's monastery also encloses the "Well of Moses", where Moses is said to have met his future wife, Zipporah. The well is still today one of the monastery's main sources of water. The site is considered sacred by adherents of the three major Abrahamic religions: Judaism, Christianity, and Islam.

Centuries after its foundation, the body of Saint Catherine of Alexandria was said to be found in a cave in the area. The relics of Saint Catherine, kept to this day inside the monastery, have made it a favourite site of pilgrimage. The patronal feast of the monastery is the Feast of the Transfiguration.

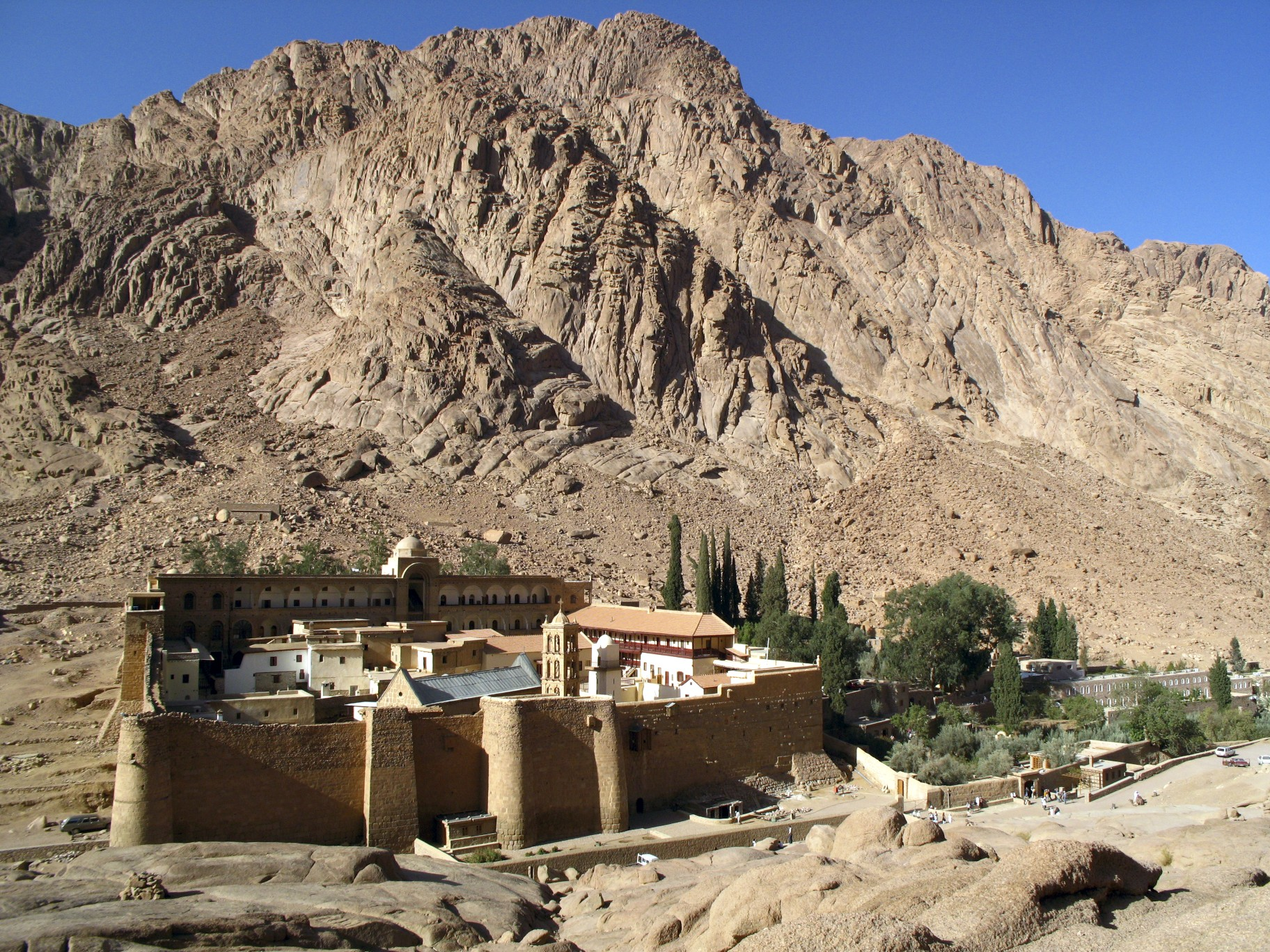
Saint Catherine's Monastery with Willow Peak (traditionally considered Mount Horeb) in the background

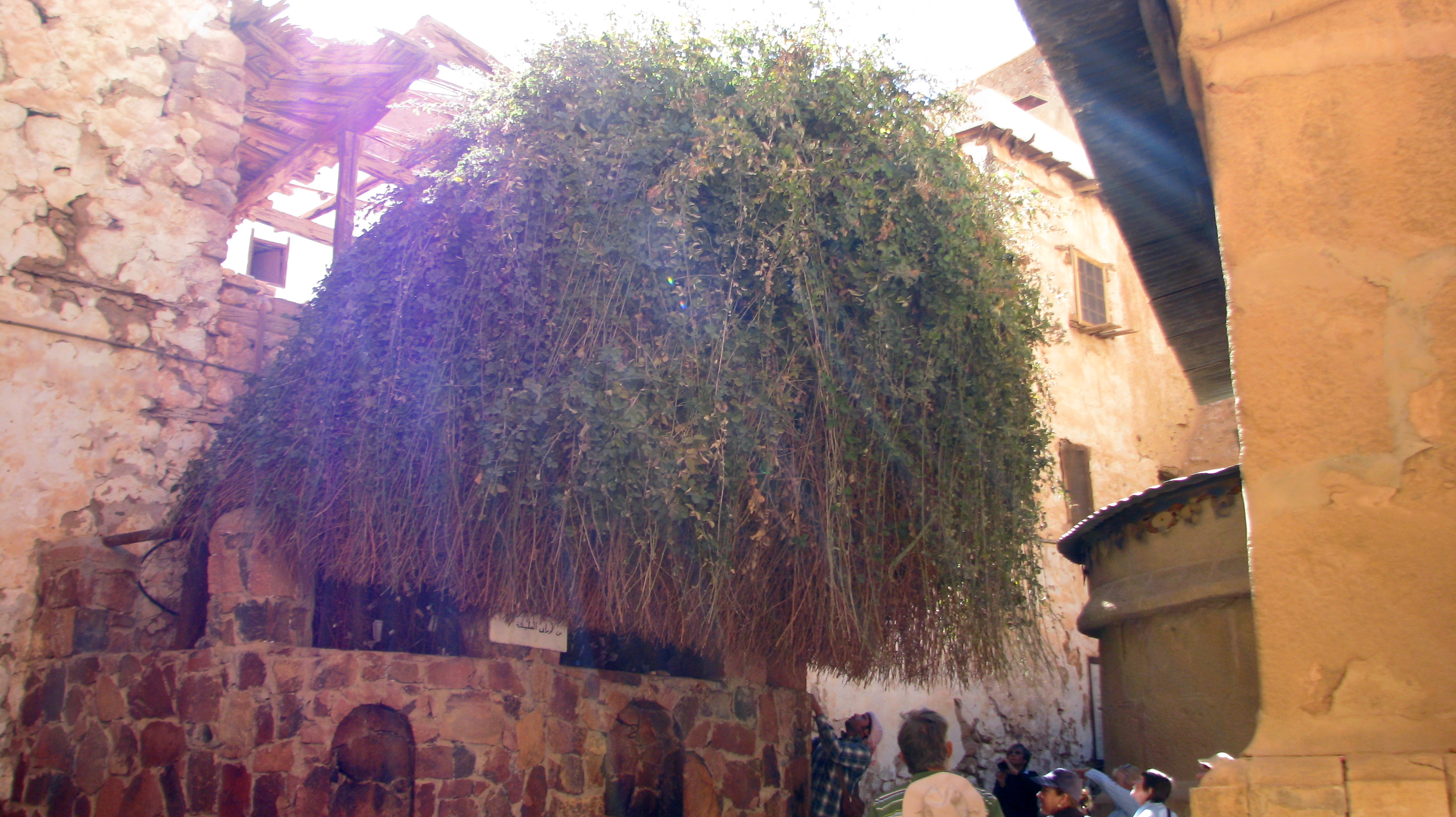
The monastery's centuries-old bramble is considered to be the biblical burning bush.

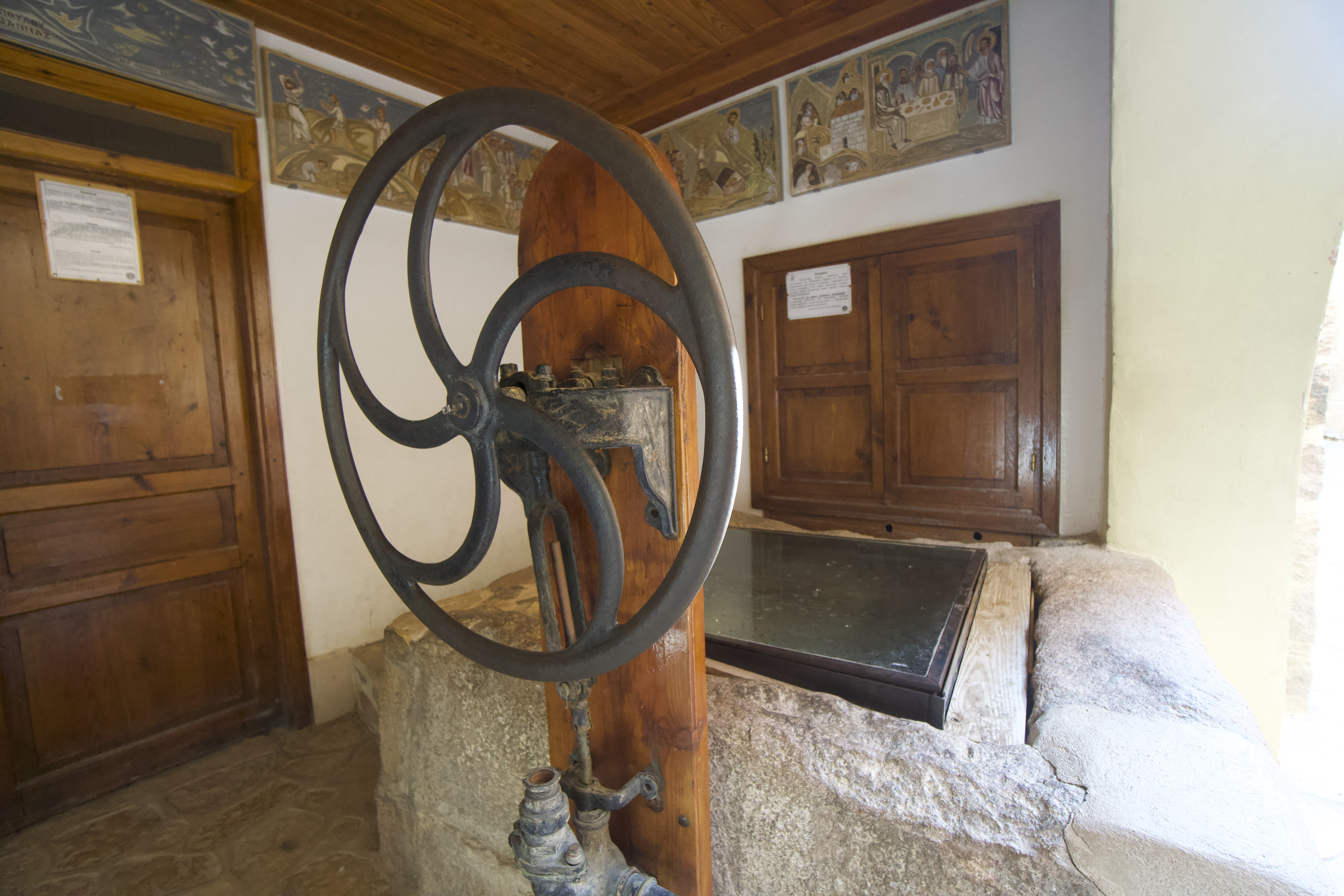
"Well of Moses", where Moses is said to have met his future wife, Zipporah

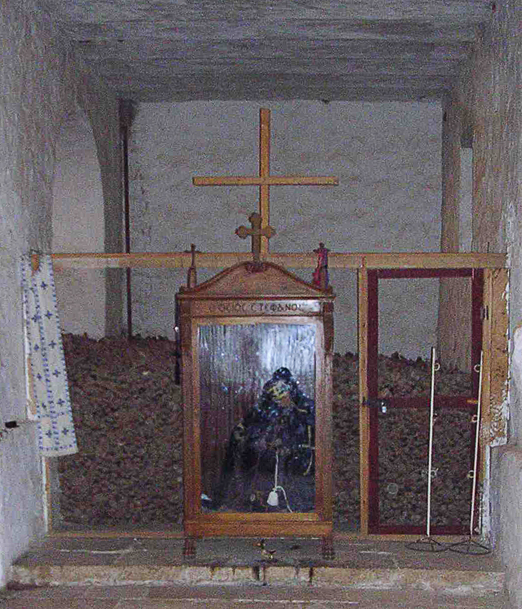
Skeleton of the monk Stephanos, in his robe, in front of the ossuary

== History ==
The oldest record of monastic life at Mount Sinai comes from the Itinerarium Egeriae, a travel journal written in Latin by a female Christian pilgrim from the Atlantic coast of Galicia or Roman Gaul named Egeria about 381/2–386.

The monastery was built by order of the Byzantine emperor Justinian I (reigned 527–565), enclosing the Chapel of the Burning Bush (also known as "Saint Helen's Chapel") ordered to be built by Empress Consort Helena, mother of Constantine I, at the site where Moses is supposed to have seen the burning bush. The bush on the grounds is said to be the one seen by Moses. Structurally, the monastery's king post truss is the oldest known surviving roof truss in the world.

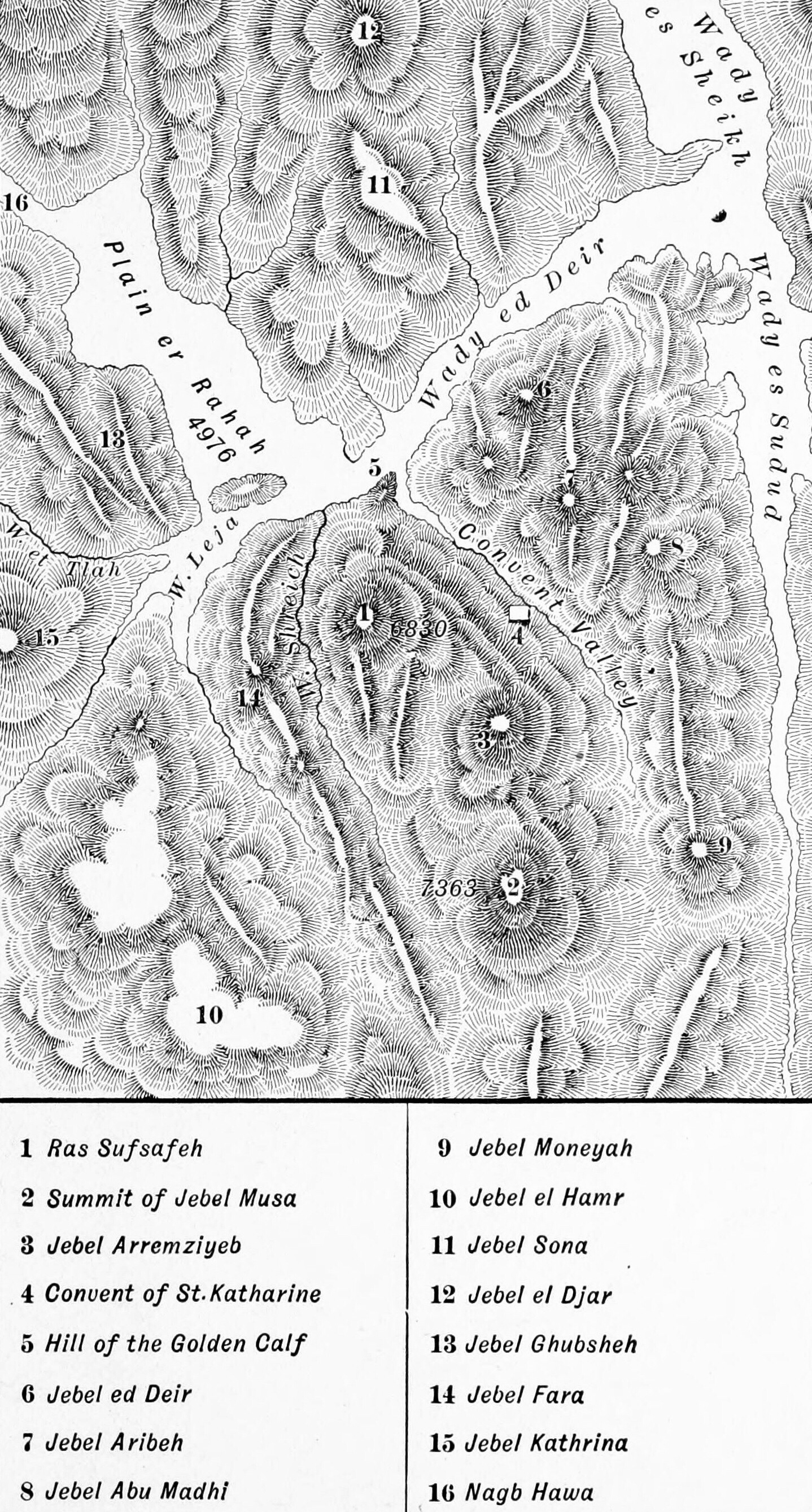
1899 map of the monastery surroundings

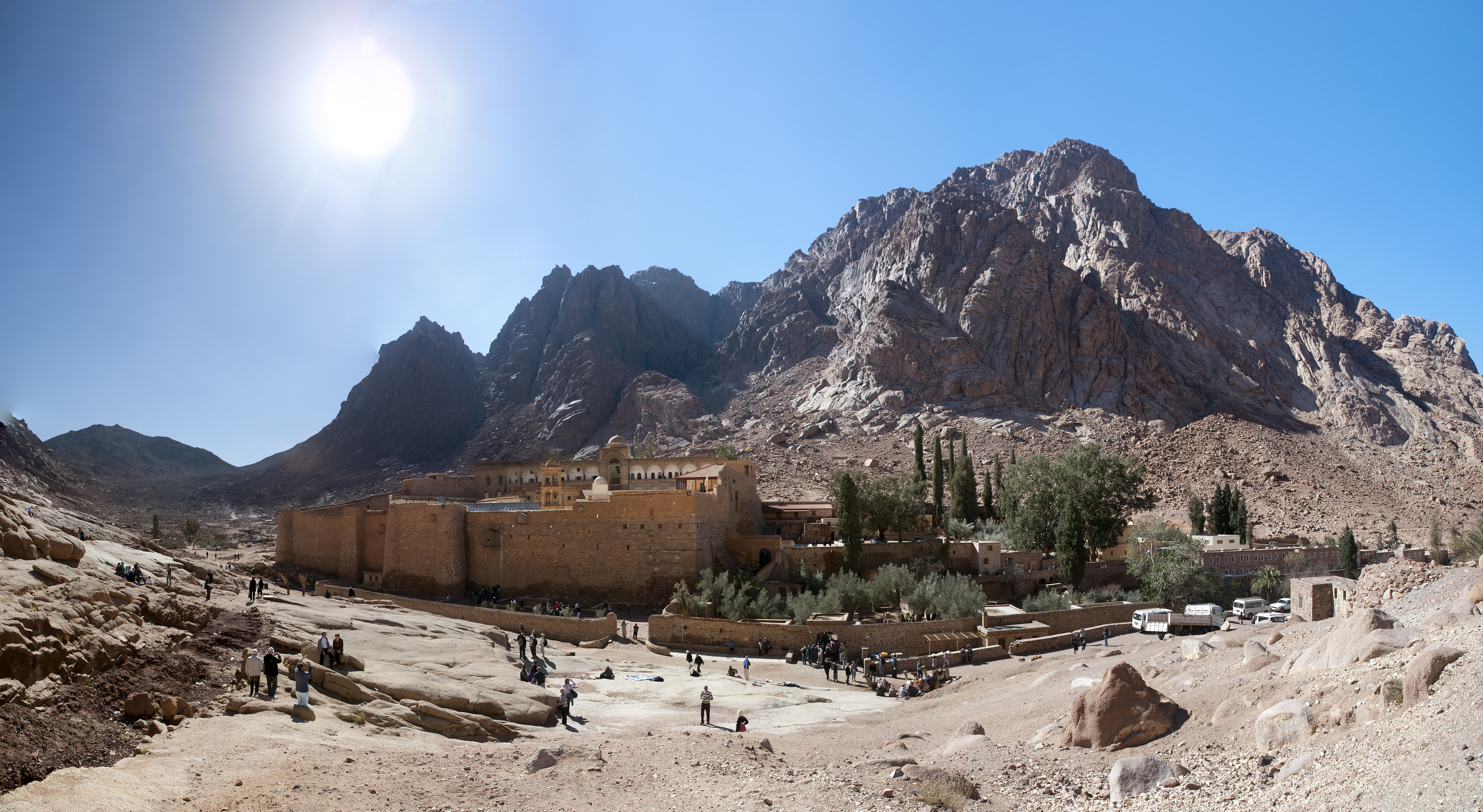
2011 photo from the north of the monastery, facing southwards

Saint Catherine's Monastery is located in the shadow of a group of three mountains: Ras Sufsafeh/"Mount Horeb" (peak c. 1 km west), Jebel Arrenziyeb (peak c. 1 km south) and Jebel Musa/"Biblical Mount Sinai" (peak c. 2 km south)

From the time of the First Crusade, the presence of Crusaders in the Sinai until 1270 spurred the interest of European Christians. It increased the number of intrepid pilgrims who visited the monastery. Its dependencies in Egypt, Palestine, Syria, Crete, Cyprus and Constantinople supported the monastery. Throughout the Middle Ages, the monastery had a multiethnic profile, with monks of Arab, Greek, Syrian, Slavonic and Georgian origin. However, in the Ottoman period, the monastic community became almost exclusively Greek Orthodox, possibly due to the decline and depopulation of Transjordanian Christian towns. From the 1480s onwards, Wallachian princes began sending alms to the monastery.

A mosque was created by converting an existing chapel during the Fatimid Caliphate (909–1171), which was in regular use until the era of the Mamluk Sultanate in the 13th century and is still in use today on special occasions. During the Ottoman Empire, the mosque was in desolate condition; it was restored in the early 20th century.

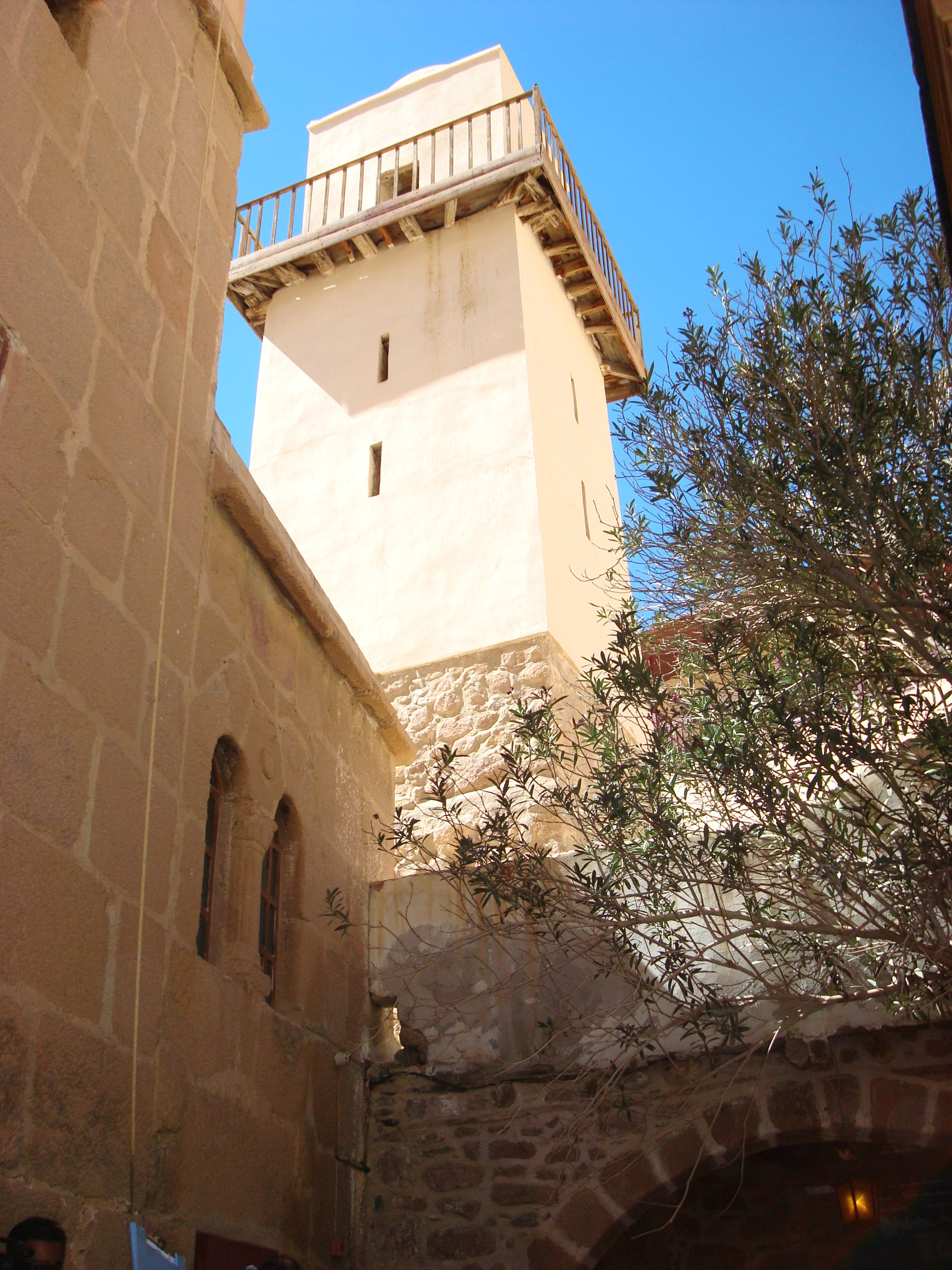
Minaret of the mosque, built in 1106

During the seventh century, the isolated Christian anchorites of the Sinai were eliminated: only the fortified monastery remained. The monastery is surrounded by the massive fortifications that have preserved it. Until the twentieth century, access was through a door high in the outer walls.

The monastery, along with several dependencies in the area, constitutes the entire Church of Sinai, which is headed by an archbishop, who is also the abbot of the monastery (Archbishop Symeon). The exact administrative status of the church within the Eastern Orthodox Church is ambiguous: by some, including the church itself, it is considered autocephalous, by others an autonomous church under the jurisdiction of the Greek Orthodox Patriarchate of Jerusalem. The archbishop is traditionally consecrated by the Greek Orthodox Patriarch of Jerusalem; in recent centuries, he has usually resided in Cairo. During the period of the Crusades, which was marked by bitterness between the Orthodox and Catholic churches, the monastery was patronized by both the Byzantine emperors and the rulers of the Kingdom of Jerusalem, and their respective courts.

Dominican theologian Felix Fabri visited the monastery in the 15th century and provided a detailed account. He also described the monastery's gardens, noting the presence of "tall fruit trees, salad herbs, grass, and grain," and "more than three thousand olive trees, many fig-trees and pomegranates, and a store of almonds and other fruits." The olives were used to produce oil for lighting lamps and as a relish in the kitchen.

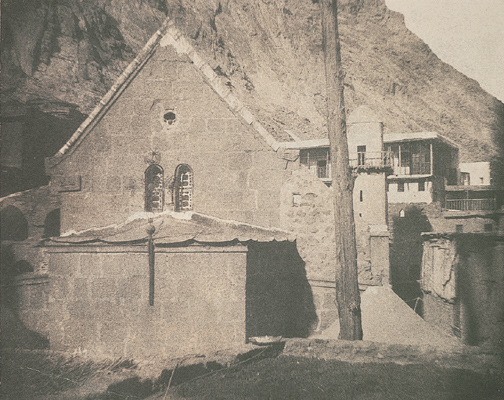
Saint Catherine's Monastery by Leavitt Hunt, 1852

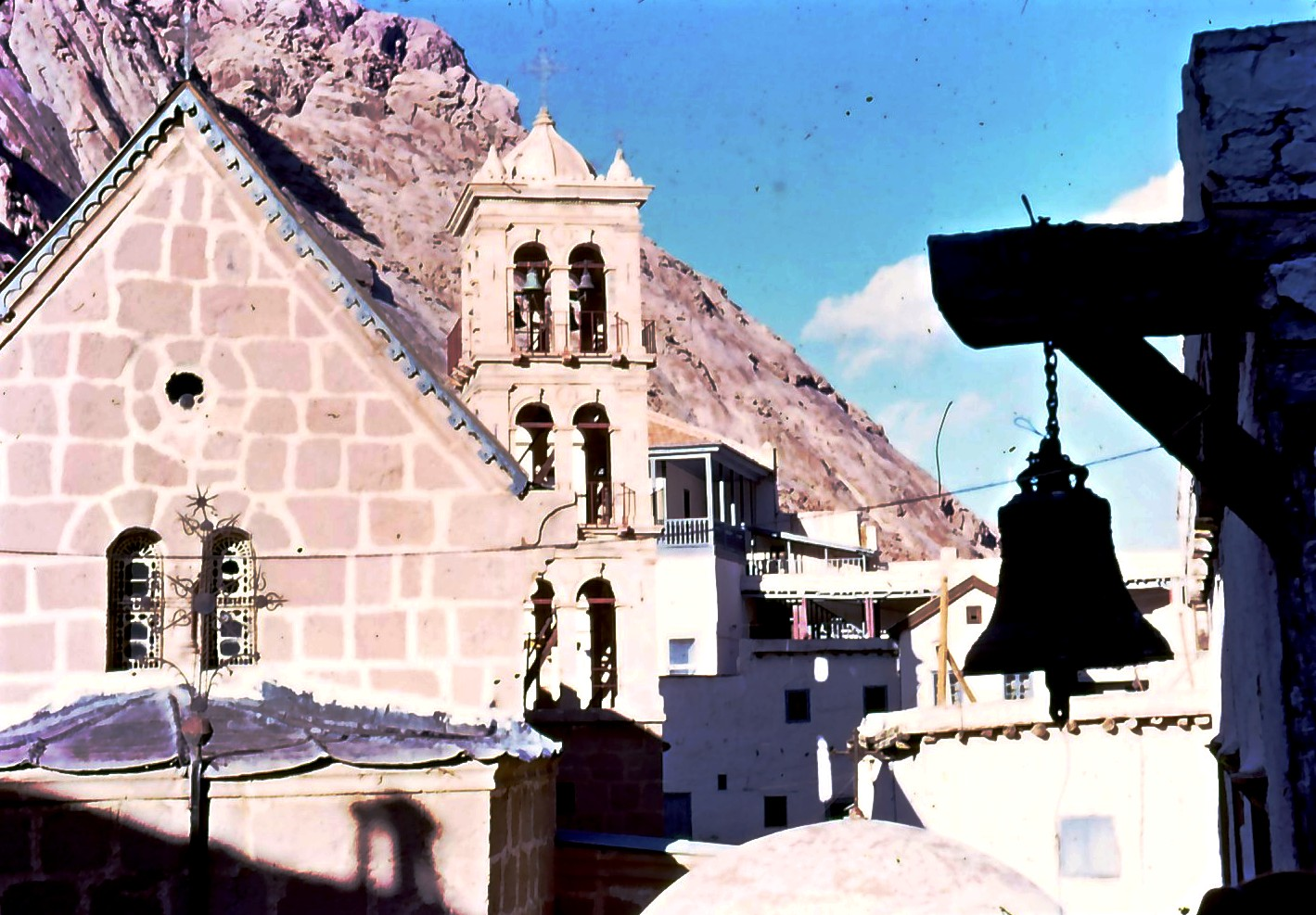
Saint Catherine's Monastery, 1968

The monastery prospered for most of the Mamluk Sultanate, but as the Sultanate declined, it went through a crisis. While there had been several hundred monks in the mid-14th century, a hundred years later, there were only several dozen. Bedouins began harassing the community, robbing their property in the Christian coastal village of el-Tor. In 1505, the monastery was captured and sacked. Although the Mamluk Sultanate demanded that the property be returned to the monks, they were unable to subdue the Bedouins and maintain order. The German explorer Martin von Baumgarten visited the monastery in 1507 and noticed its decline.

On April 18, 2017, an attack by the Islamic State – Sinai Province at a checkpoint near the monastery killed one policeman and injured three police officers.

On May 28, 2025, the Ismailia Court of Appeal, an Egyptian appellate court, issued a 160-page ruling titled "Property Law, Religious Ownership and International Heritage Obligations: the Legal State of the Saint Catherine’s Monastery at stake" between the South Sinai Governorate and the Church of Sinai over the underlying lands of the monastery and its immediate surroundings. The ruling stated that the monastery has usufruct rights, is part of the public domain, and is classified as an antiquity under the Egyptian Ministry of Tourism and Antiquities. It focused on cadastre issues while omitting reference to the Ashtiname of Muhammad and UNESCO. This case is still ongoing as of early 2026, as the South Sinai Governorate filed a request for omission regarding unresolved financial obligations and the extent of administrative authority over property changes.

The ruling also triggered diplomatic concern between Cairo and the EU, particularly Athens and the Greek Orthodox Church, in connection with Egypt’s state-led Great Transfiguration Project. This is a large-scale tourism development project aimed at religious tourism in Saint Catherine’s region. Kyriakos Mitsotakis and Patriarch Theophilos III of Jerusalem were reportedly reassured by Egyptian officials that the monastery’s religious status would be preserved. Egyptian President Abdel Fattah el-Sisi co-chaired the Higher Council for Cooperation meeting in Athens with Greek Prime Minister Kyriakos Mitsotakis at the Maximos Mansion.

In a statement issued on June 4, 2025, Greek Foreign Minister George Gerapetritis and Egyptian Foreign Minister Badr Abdelatty discussed the ruling and reaffirmed cooperation on the matter. On October 30, Michael Rigas attended the enthronement of Symeon VI as Archbishop of Mount Sinai and Raithu at the monastery. Symeon VI, born in Greece, had previously been elected and ordained at the Church of the Holy Sepulchre before traveling to Greece in November. Egyptian authorities maintain that, under administrative practice, the abbot of the monastery must be an Egyptian citizen. Egyptian nationality law generally requires 10 years of residency unless granted by presidential decree.

== Manuscripts and icons ==
Georgian manuscript from St. Catherine's Monastery, Sinai Mountain, 979 AD.

The monastery's library, founded sometime between 527 and 565, is recognized by Guinness World Records as the world's oldest continuously operating library. It preserves the world's second-largest collection of early codices and manuscripts, outnumbered only by the Vatican Library. It contains Greek, Christian Palestinian Aramaic, Syriac, Georgian, Arabic, Geʽez, Latin, Armenian, and Church Slavonic manuscripts and books, along with very rare Hebrew and Coptic books.

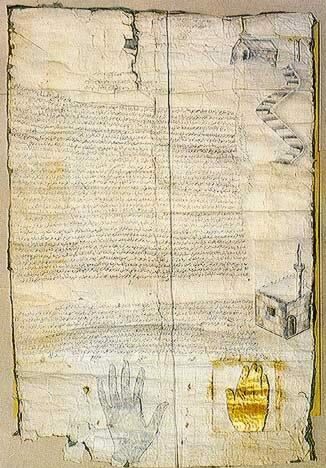
Ashtiname of Muhammad, granting protection and other privileges to the followers of Jesus

In May 1844 and February 1859, Constantin von Tischendorf visited the monastery for research and discovered the Codex Sinaiticus, dating from the 4th century, at the time the oldest almost completely preserved manuscript of the Bible. The finding from 1859 left the monastery for Imperial Russia in circumstances that had been long disputed. But in 2003 Russian scholars discovered the donation act for the manuscript signed by the Council of Cairo Metochion and Archbishop Callistratus on 13 November 1869. The monastery received 9000 rubles as a gift from Tsar Alexander II of Russia. The Codex was sold by Stalin in 1933 to the British Museum and is now in the British Library, London, where it is on public display. Prior to September 1, 2009, a previously unseen fragment of Codex Sinaiticus was discovered in the monastery's library, as well as among the New Finds of 1975. On other visits (1855, 1857) Constantin von Tischendorf also amassed their more valuable manuscripts (Greek, Christian Palestinian Aramaic, Georgian, Syriac) and took them with him to St. Petersburg and Leipzig, where they are stored today.

=== Agnes Smith Lewis and Margaret Dunlop Gibson ===
In February 1892, Agnes S. Lewis discovered an early palimpsest manuscript of the Gospel in St Catherine Monastery's library that became known as the Syriac Sinaiticus and it remains in the monastery's possession. The text was deciphered by Francis Crawford Burkitt and Robert Lubbock Bensly. The twins Agnes Smith Lewis and Margaret Dunlop Gibson returned in 1893 with the Cambridge team of the two scholars that included their wives, and also J. Rendel Harris to photograph and transcribe the manuscript in its entirety, as well as to prepare the first catalogues of the Syriac and Arabic manuscripts. Among the new finds two additional palimpsest manuscripts came to light containing additional passages of the Old Syriac Gospels.

External videos
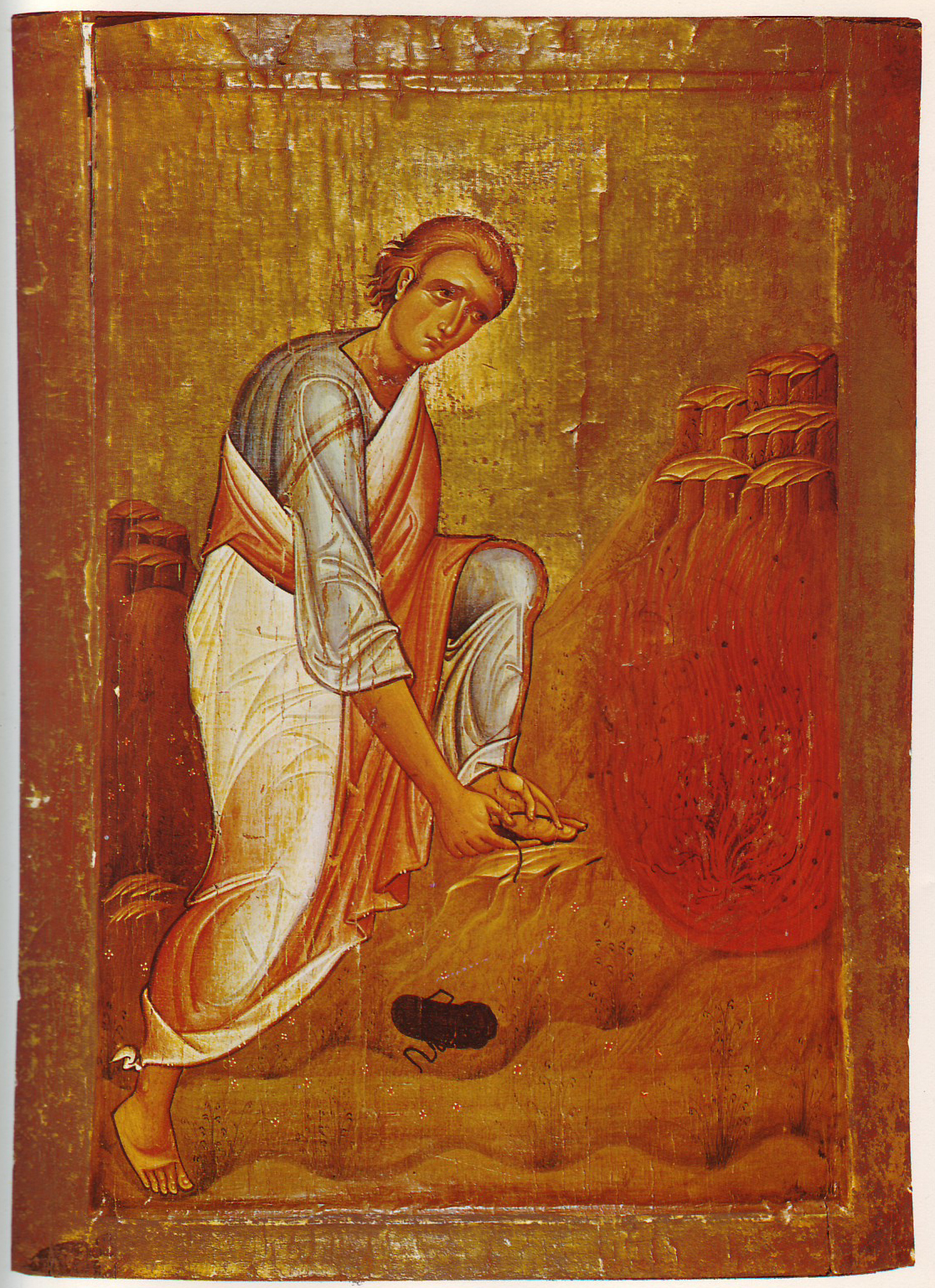
- The Icons of Saint Catherine's Monastery, Sinai, Egypt (Archived), J. Paul Getty Museum

The Monastery also has a copy of the Ashtiname of Muhammad, in which Muhammad is claimed to have bestowed his protection upon the monastery.

Additionally, the monastery houses a copy of Mok'c'evay K'art'lisay, a collection of supplementary books of The Georgian Chronicles dating to the 9th century.

The most important manuscripts have since been filmed or digitized and are therefore accessible to scholars. With planning assistance from Ligatus, a research center of the University of the Arts London, the library was extensively renovated, reopening at the end of 2017.

=== Sinai Palimpsests Project ===
Since 2011, a team of imaging scientists and experienced scholars in the decipherment of palimpsest manuscripts from the U.S. and Europe have photographed, digitized, and studied the library's collection of palimpsests during the international Sinai palimpsests project.

Palimpsests are notable for having been reused one or more times over the centuries. Since parchment was expensive and time-consuming to produce, monks would erase texts with orange juice or scrape them off and write over them. Though the original texts were once assumed to be lost, imaging scientists used narrowband multispectral imaging techniques and technologies to reveal features that were difficult to see with the human eye, including ink residues and small grooves in the parchment. These images have subsequently been digitized and are now freely available for research at the UCLA Library for scholarly use.

As of June 2018, over 160 palimpsests have been identified, with over 6,800 pages of texts recovered. The newer finds were discovered in a secluded storage area of the St George Tower in 1975. Highlights include "108 pages of previously unknown Greek poems and the oldest-known recipe attributed to the Greek physician Hippocrates;" additional folios for the transmission of the Old Syriac Gospels; two unattested witnesses of an early Christian apocryphal text the Dormition of Mary (Transitus Mariae) of which most of the Greek text is lost; a previously unknown martyrdom of Patriklos of Caesarea Maritima (Israel), one of the eleven followers of Pamphilus of Caesarea; some of the earliest known Georgian manuscripts; as well as insight into dead languages such as the previously hardly attested Caucasian Albanian and Christian Palestinian Aramaic, the local dialect of the early Byzantine period, with many unparalleled text witnesses.

== Stainless Steel Boxing Project ==
The Saint Catherine Foundation partnered with the Ligatus Research Centre at London's University of the Arts to order the creation of steel boxes for the storage and transportation of rare manuscripts contained within the library at St. Catherine's Monastery at Mt. Sinai. The objective of the Saint Catherine Foundation is to house 2,187 parchment manuscripts in individual boxes made from stainless steel. These are determined to provide the best protection against the desert environment, natural disasters such as earthquakes, and erosion from age.

Stainless steel was recommended over wooden boxes due to the potential of acidic gasses being released inside a sealed box, damaging any pigments in the miniatures that are pH sensitive. Stainless steel boxes are resistant to insect attack while wooden boxes are not. Wood boxes tend to offer more insulation against heat penetration in case of a fire but are flammable whereas stainless steel is fireproof. Each case utilizes an oxygen starvation system allowing for greater protection against fire damage.

Each box is created from a 304 grade stainless steel sheet, cut from an Amada guillotine, and formed by a CNC punch press. Corner seams are hand welded and polished with precision. The inside of each steel box is lined with a polyester foam called Plastazote. Each manuscript is wrapped in acid-free card stock and placed with its spine opposite to the side with the handle. Pressure of the weight of the book is borne by the spine should the box be carried by the handle.

== Works of art ==
The complex houses irreplaceable works of art: mosaics, the best collection of early icons in the world, many in encaustic, as well as liturgical objects, chalices and reliquaries, and church buildings. The large icon collection begins with a few dating to the 5th (possibly) and 6th centuries, which are unique survivals; the monastery having been untouched by Byzantine iconoclasm, and never sacked. The oldest icon on an Old Testament theme is also preserved there. A project to catalogue the collections has been ongoing since the 1960s. The monastery was an important centre for the development of the hybrid style of Crusader art, and retains over 120 icons created in the style, by far the largest collection in existence. Many were evidently created by Latins, probably monks, based in or around the monastery in the 13th century.

== Icons ==
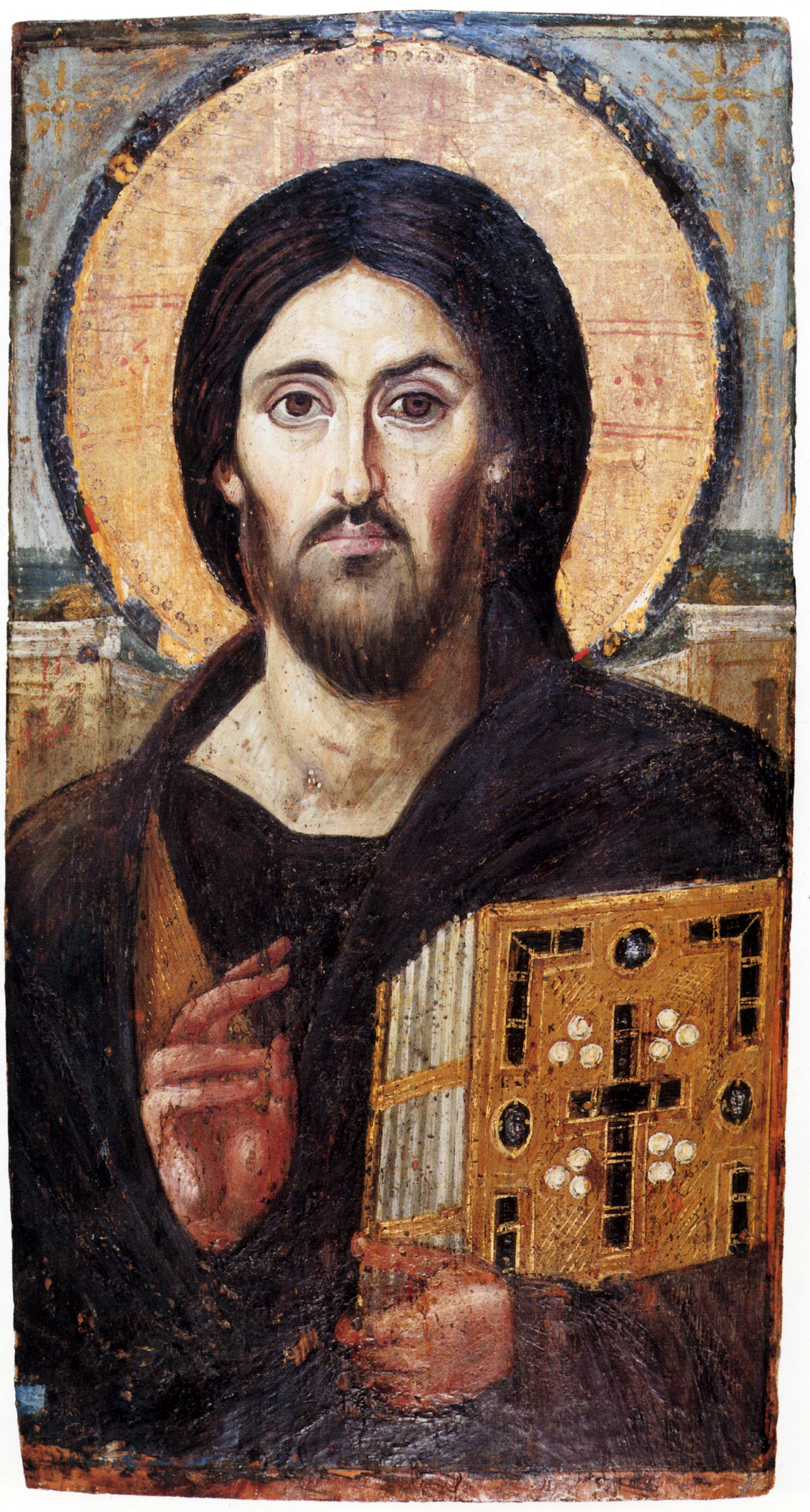
The oldest known icon of Christ Pantocrator, encaustic on panel

Saint Peter depicted in 6th-century hot wax icon

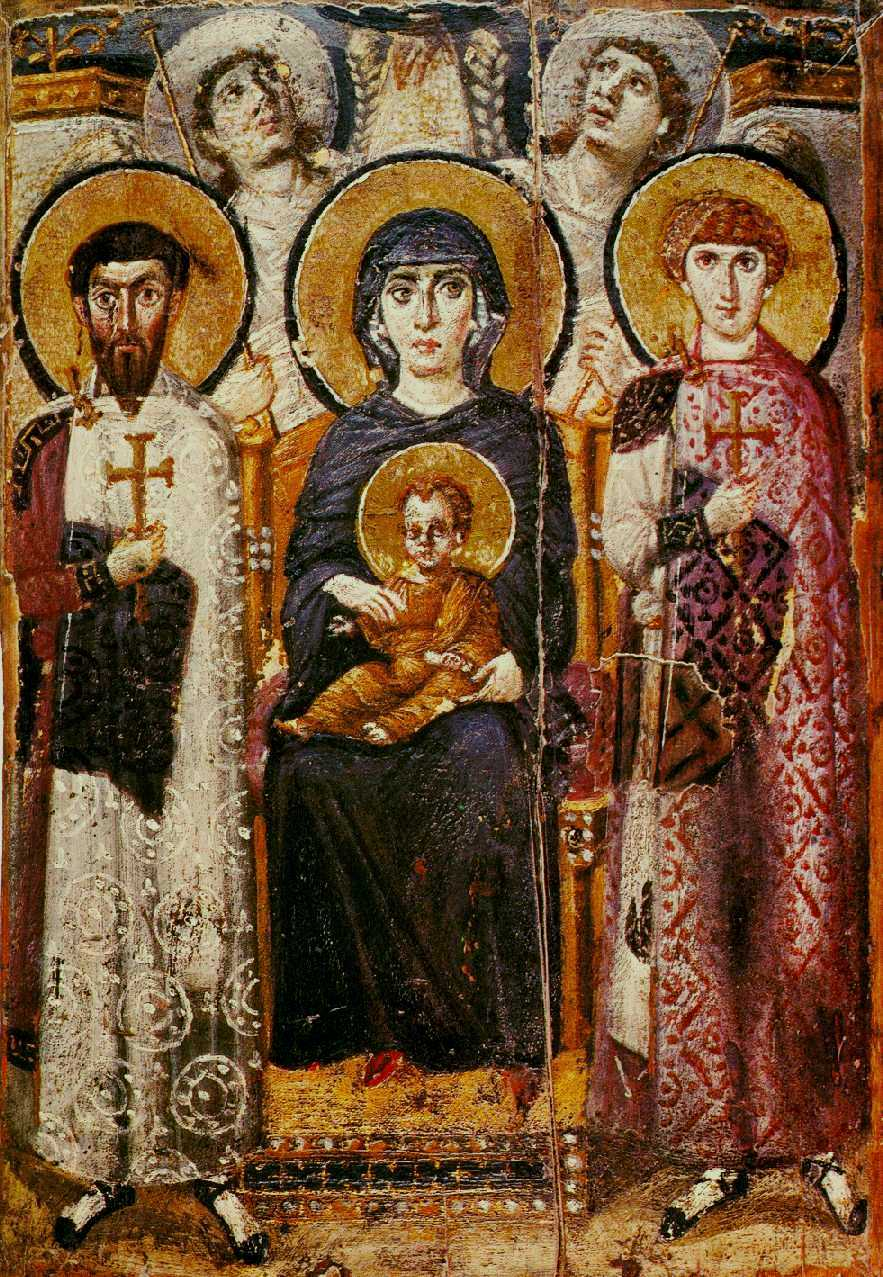
Icon of the enthroned Virgin and Child with saints and angels, 6th century

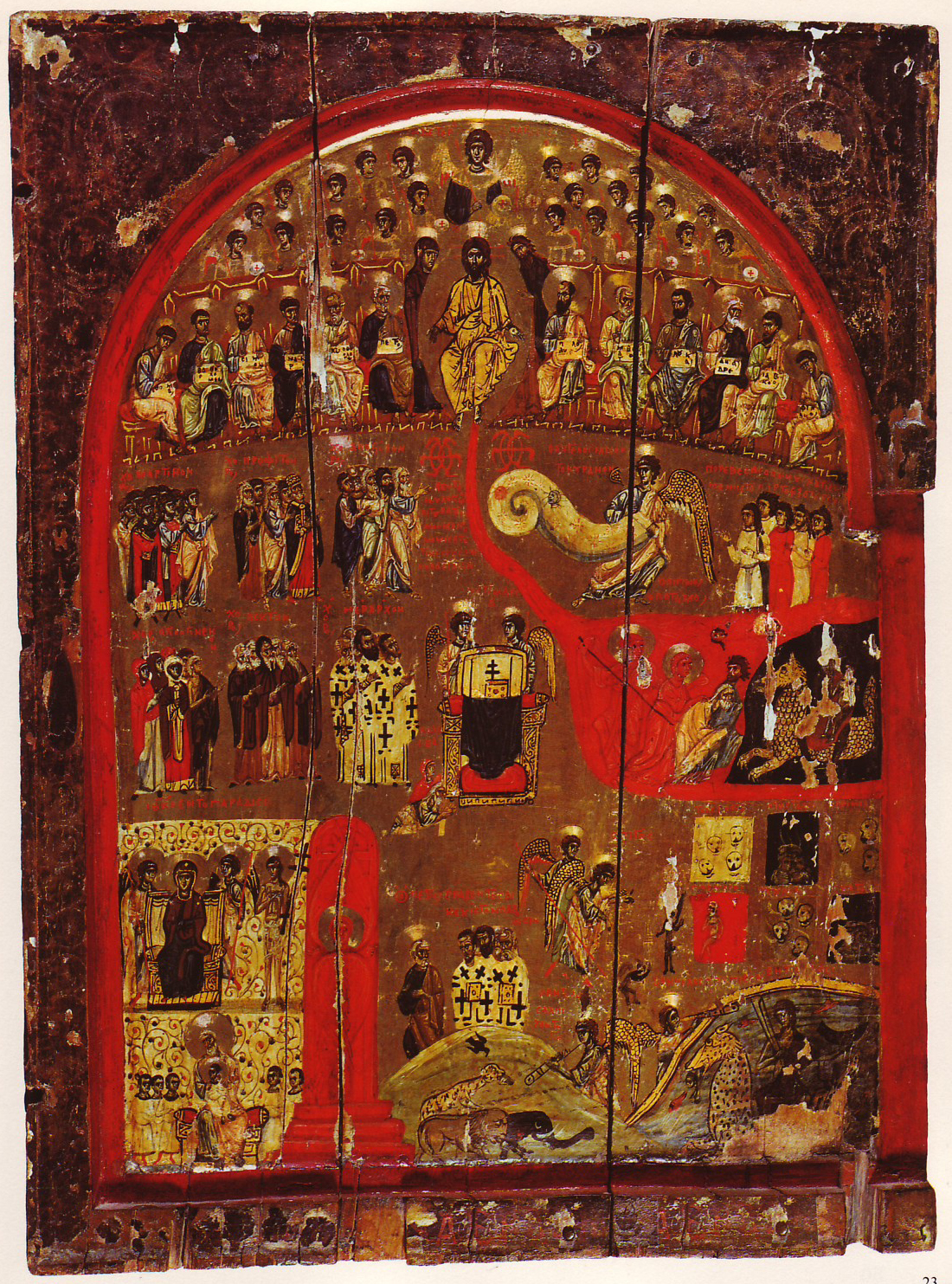
The Last Judgement, 11th–12th century, by John Tohabi

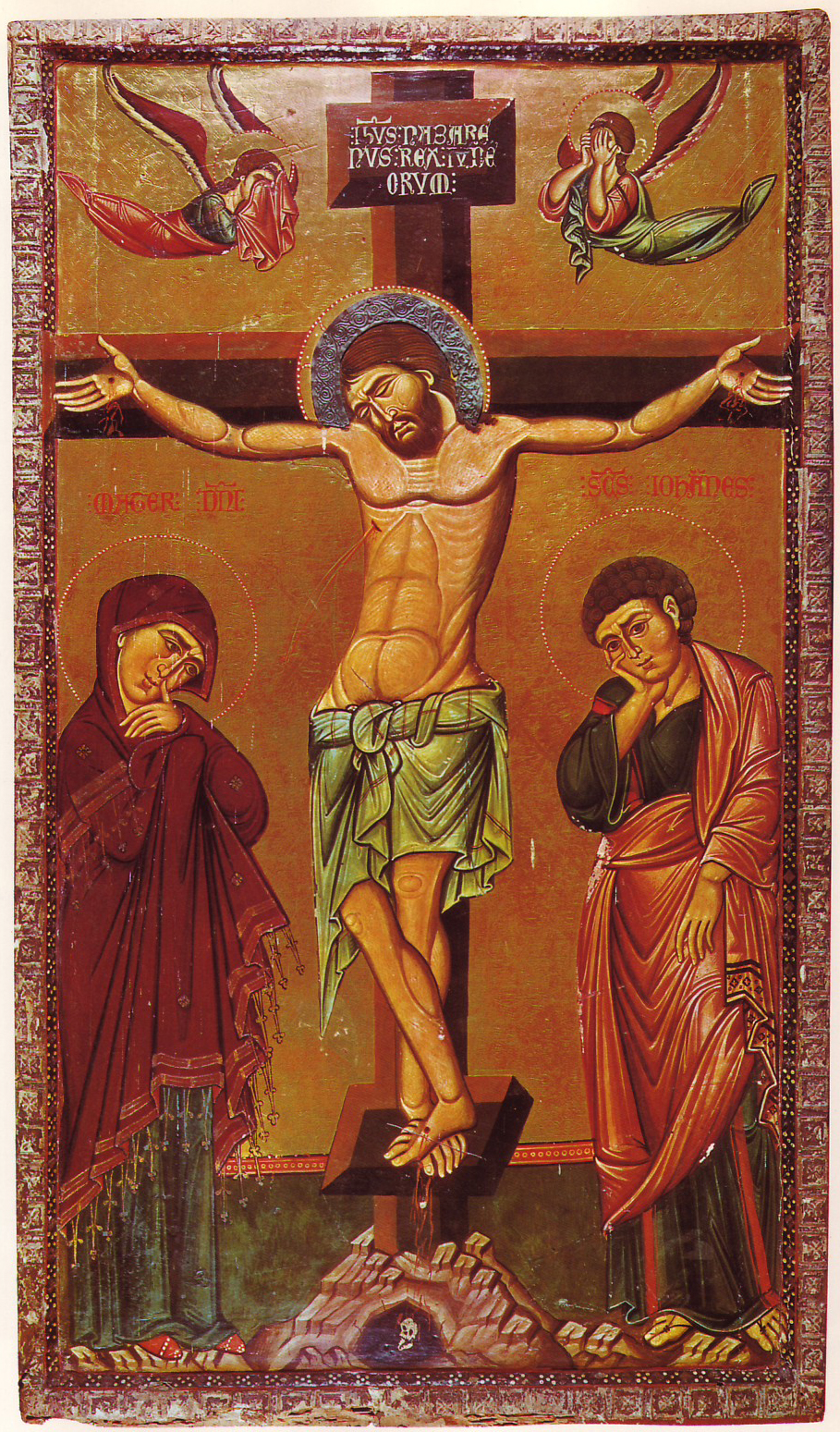
Crucifixion, 13th century

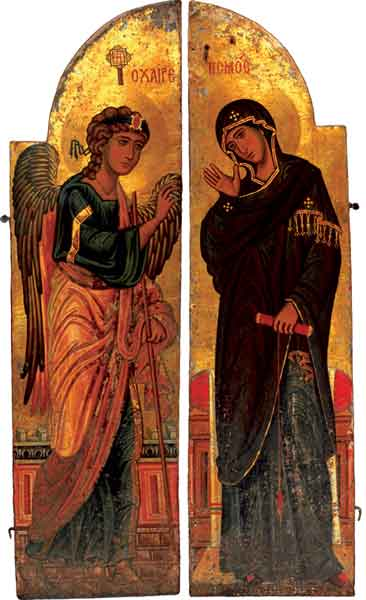
Holy doors

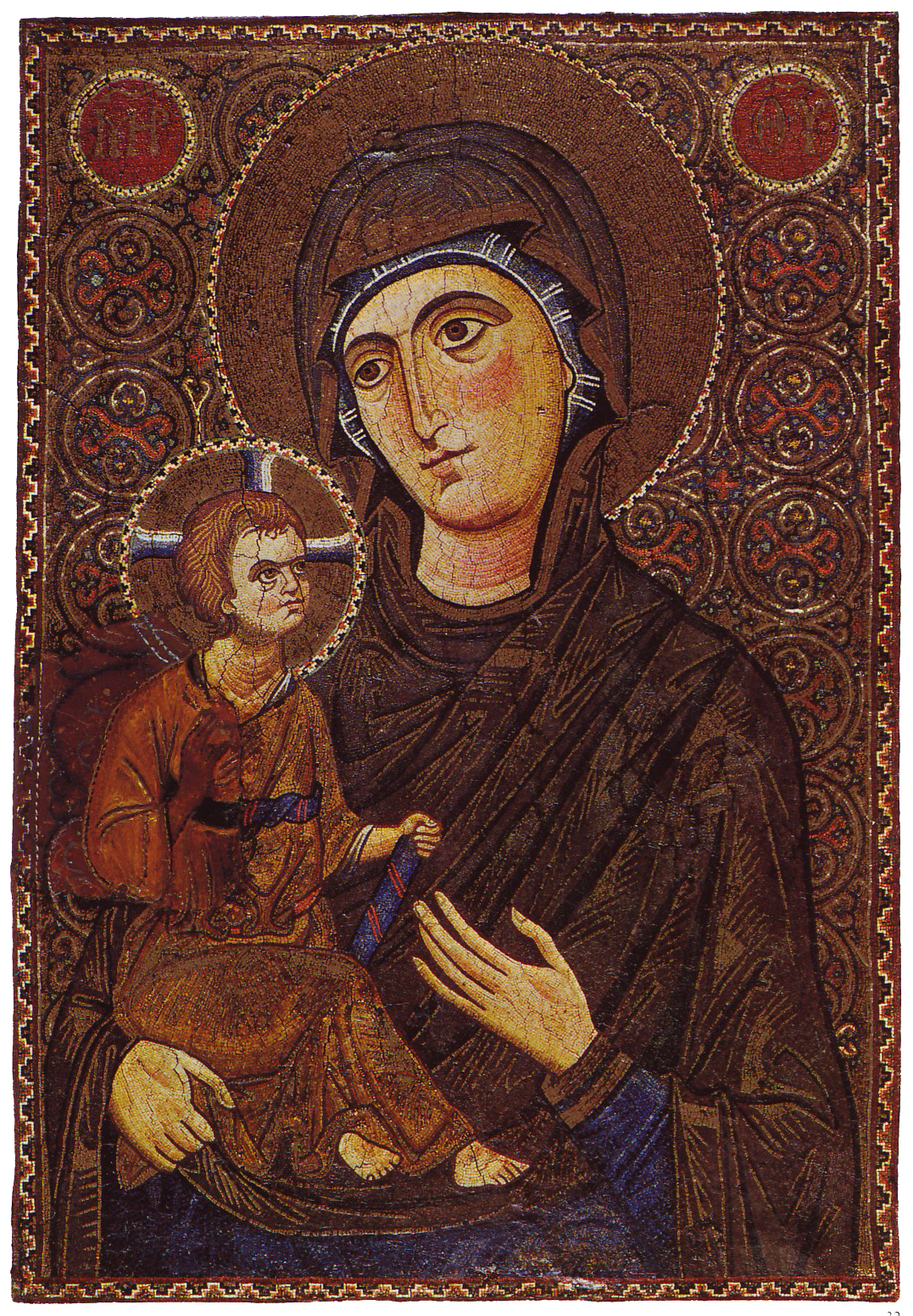
Madonna and child, 13th century

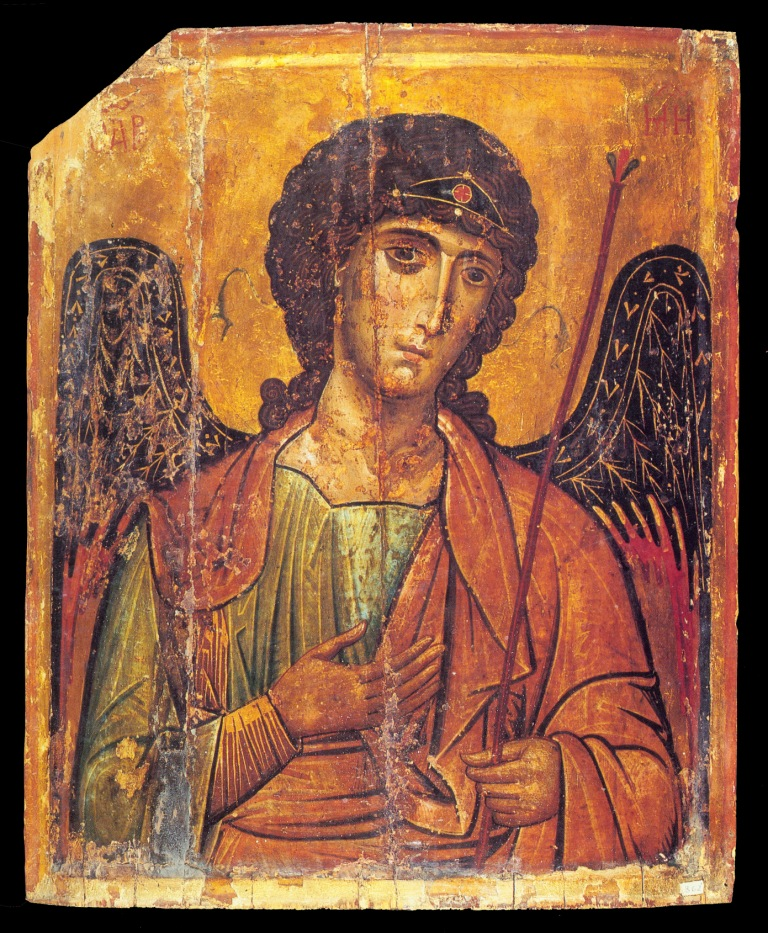
13th century Byzantine icon of Saint Michael the Archangel

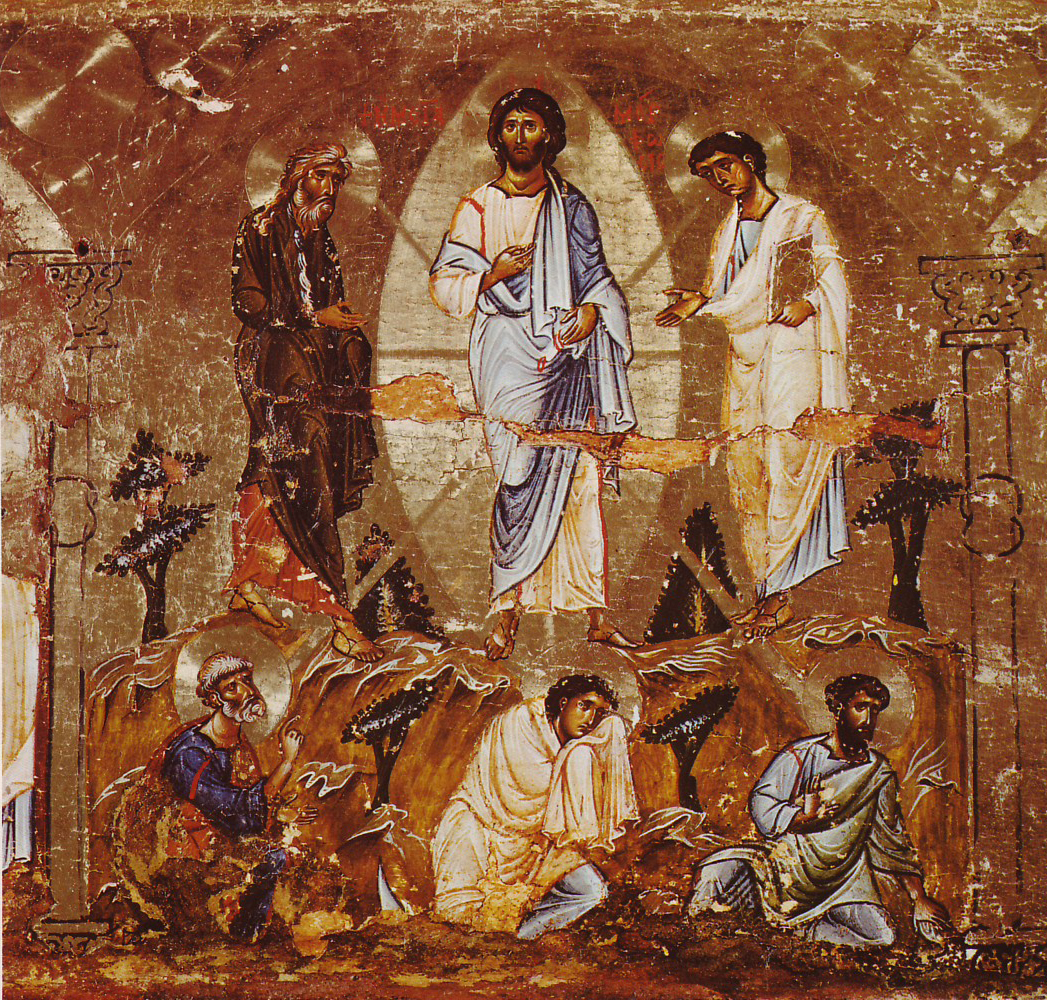
Transfiguration, 12th century

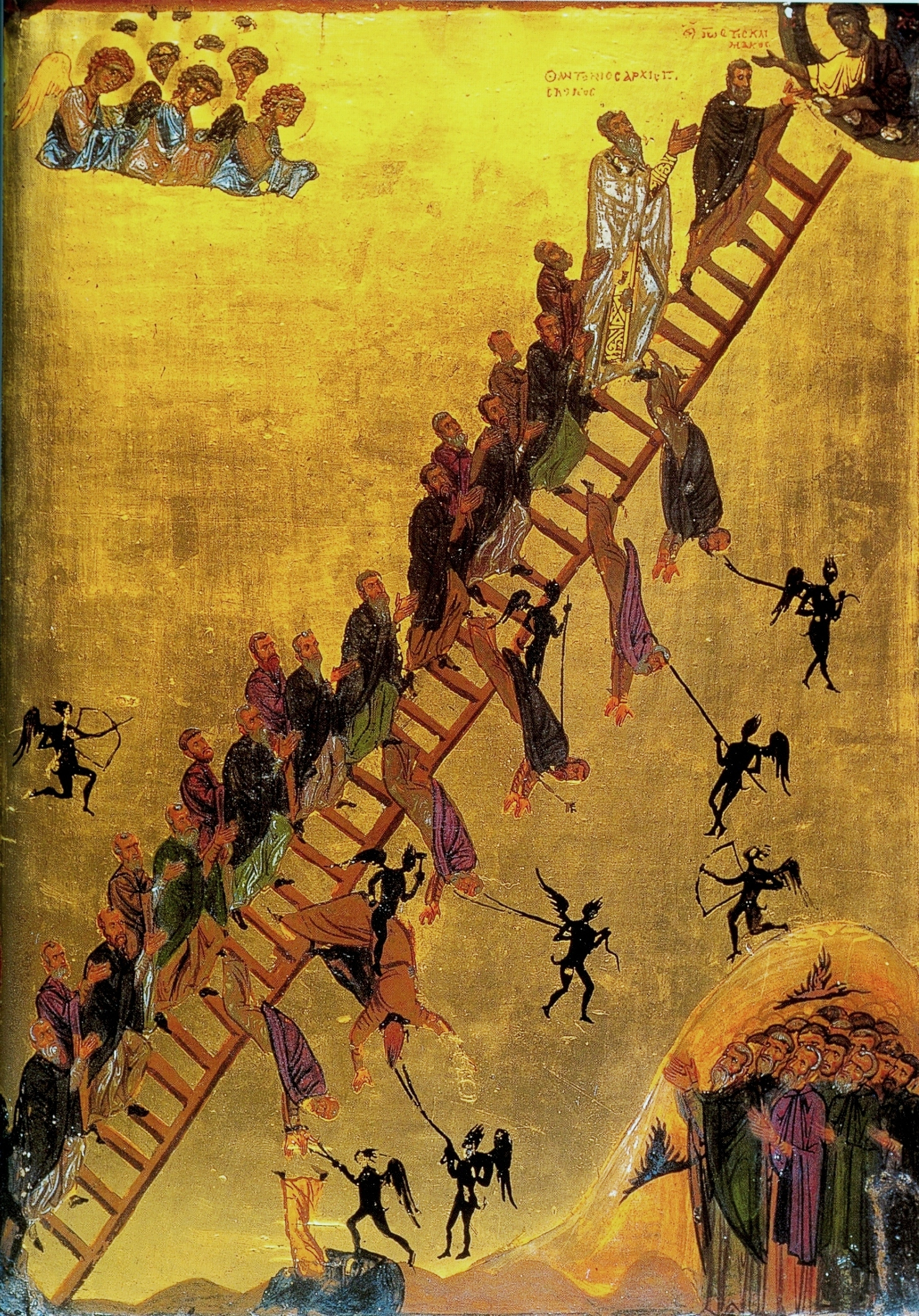
Ladder of Divine Ascent

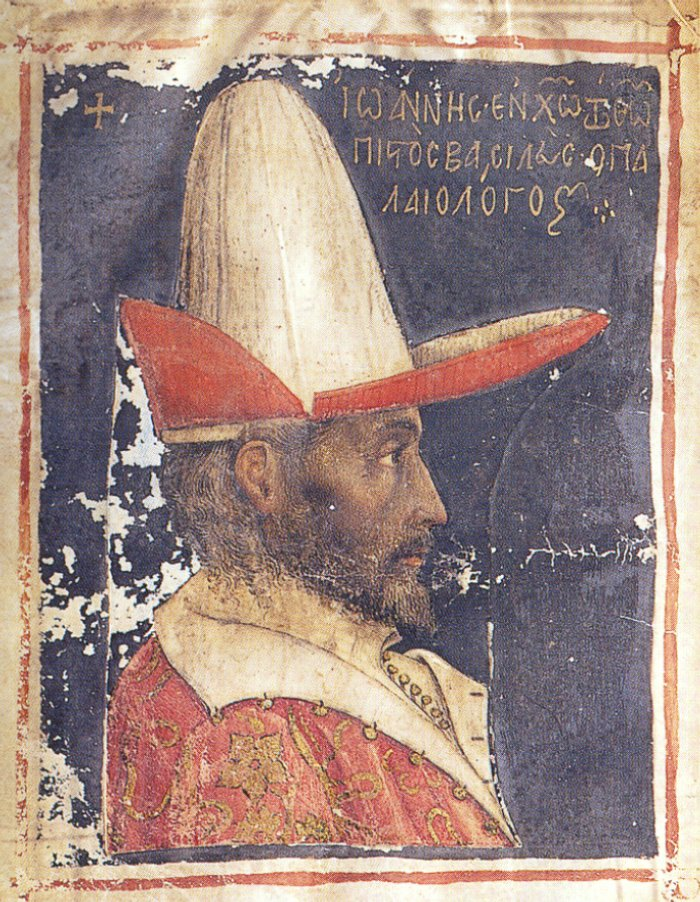
Emperor John VIII Palaiologos

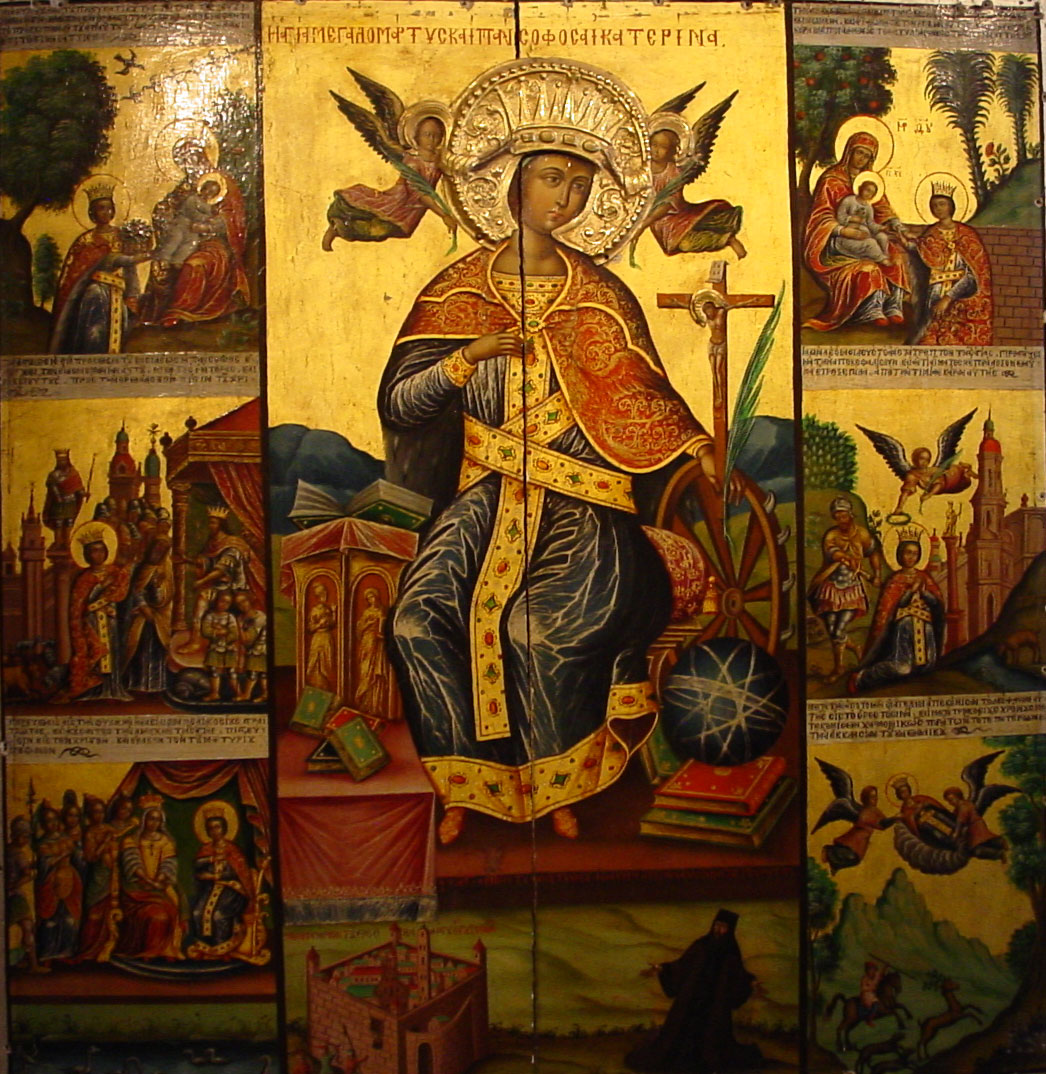
Icon of Saint Catherine of Alexandria

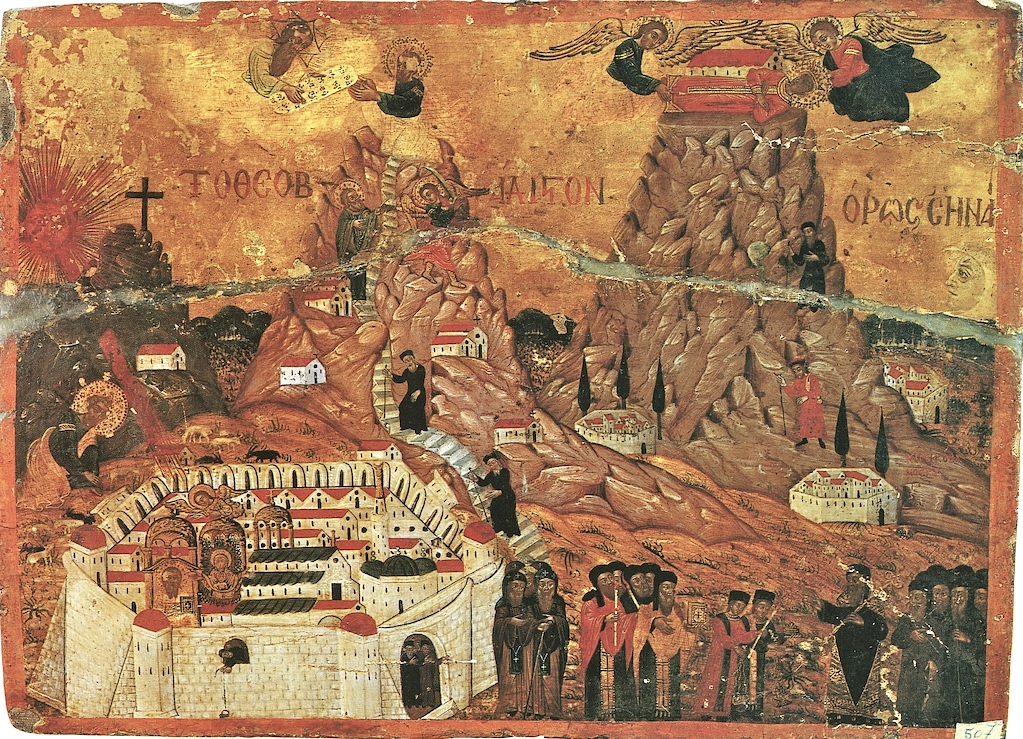
The monastery, 18th century

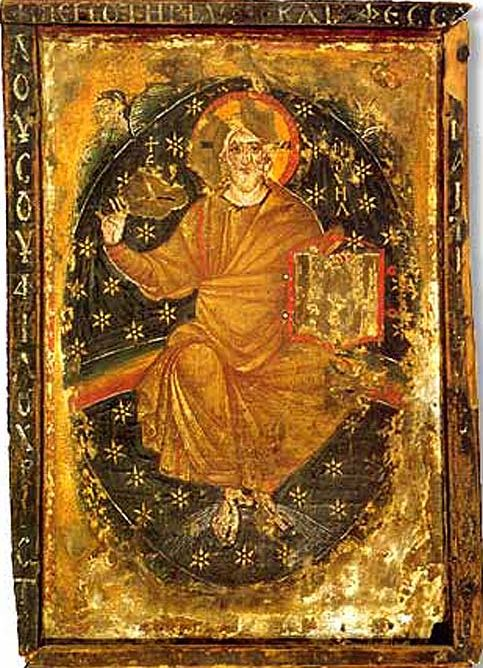
Christ as the Ancient of Days, 7th century

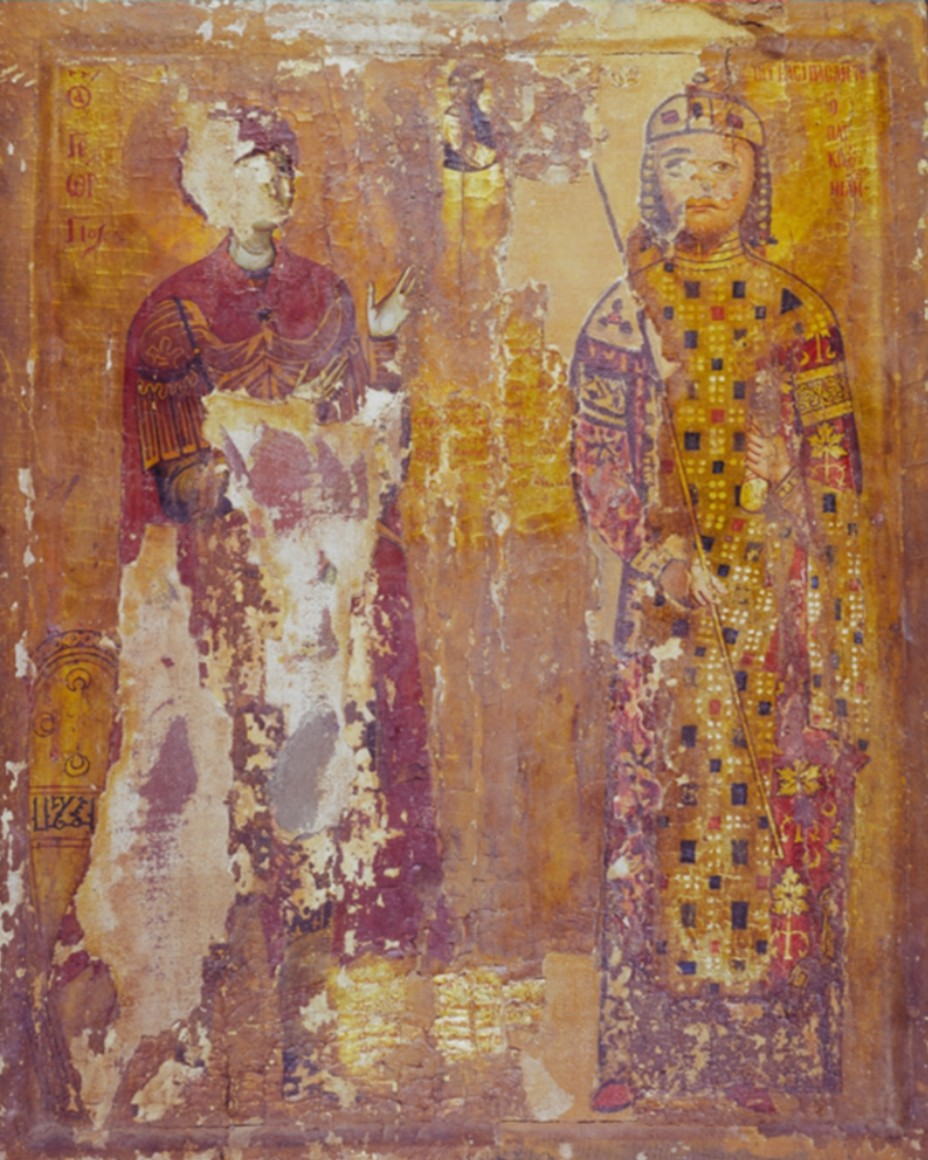
12th century icon of Saint George and David IV of Georgia

== Historical images ==
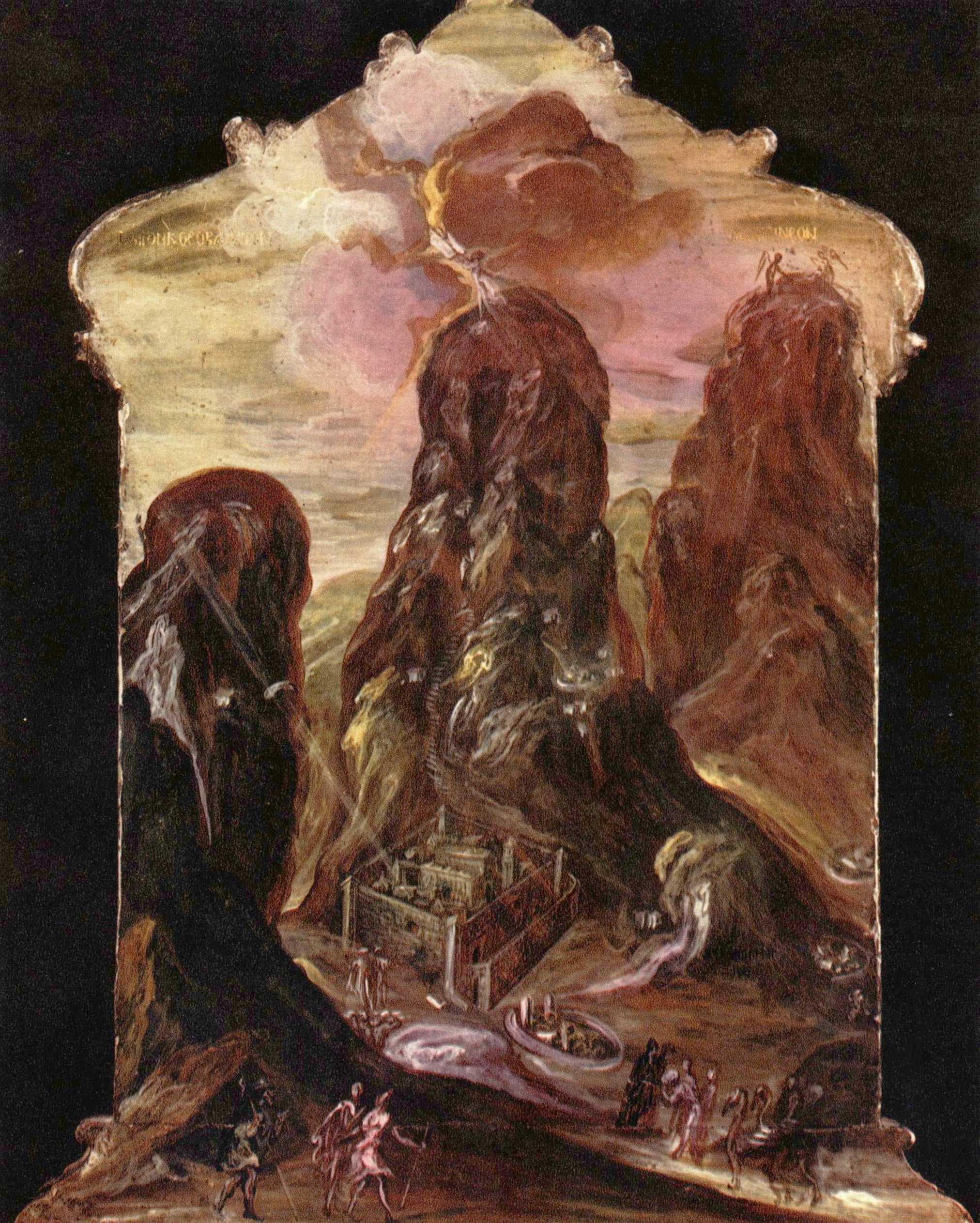
El Greco (1568)

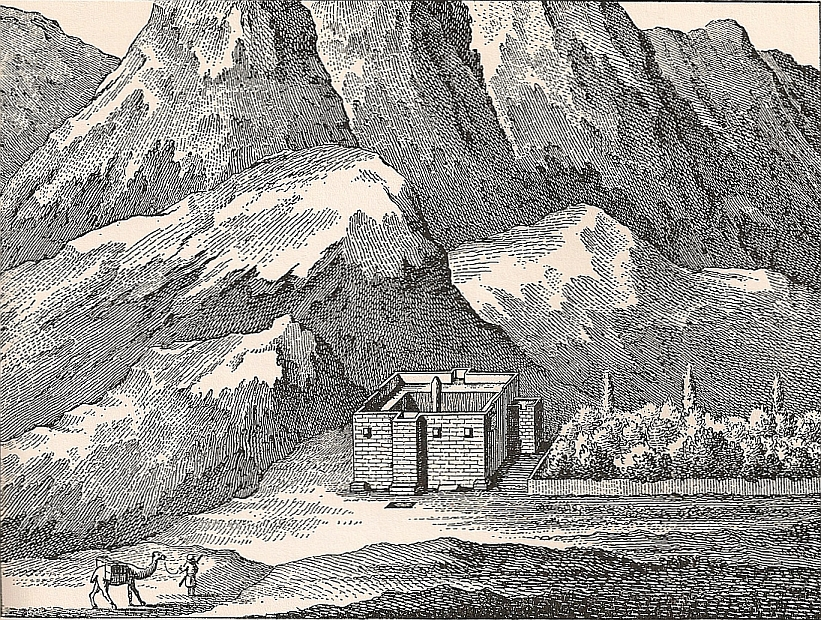
Carsten Niebuhr (1762)

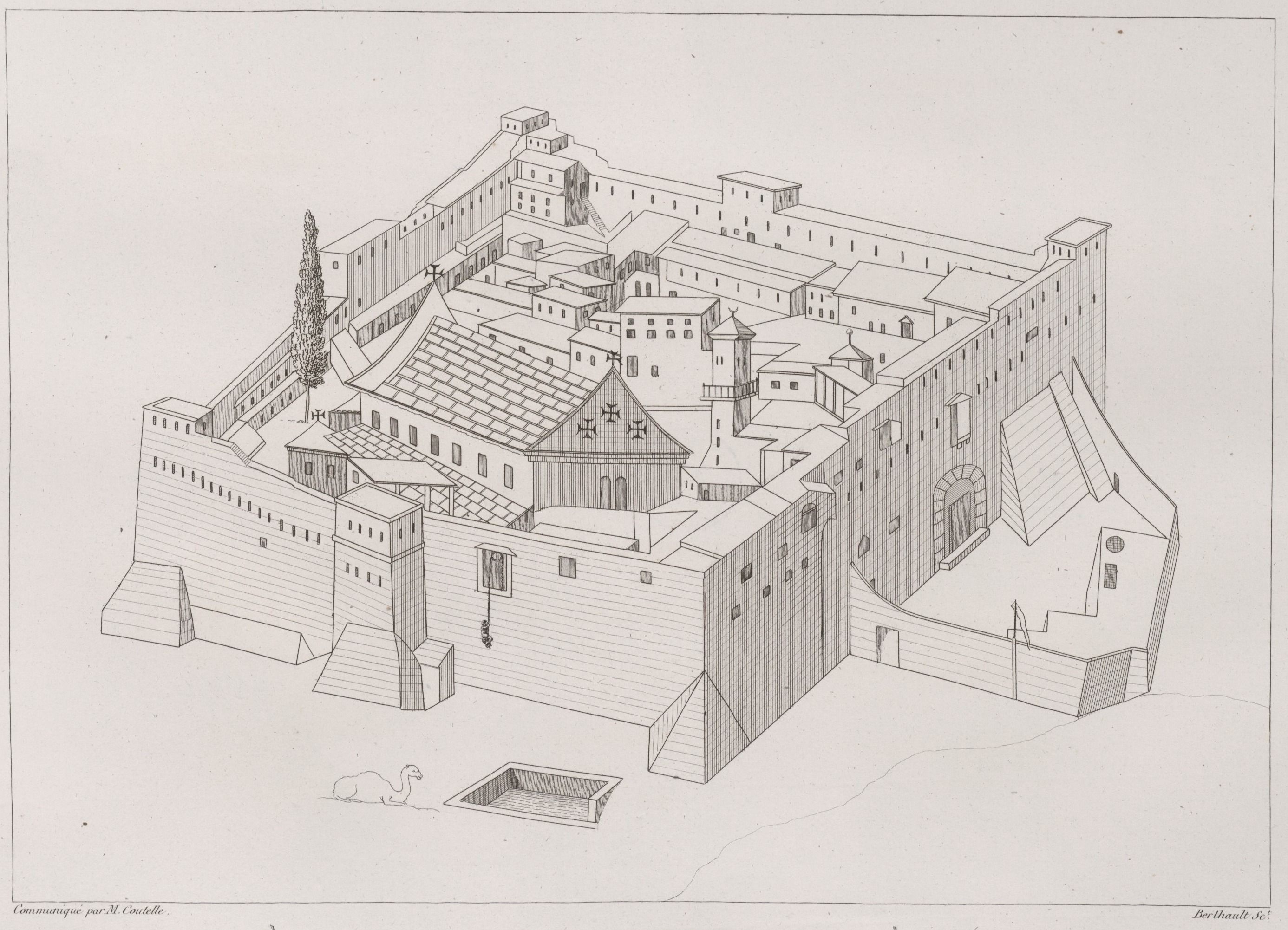
Description de l'Égypte (1809)

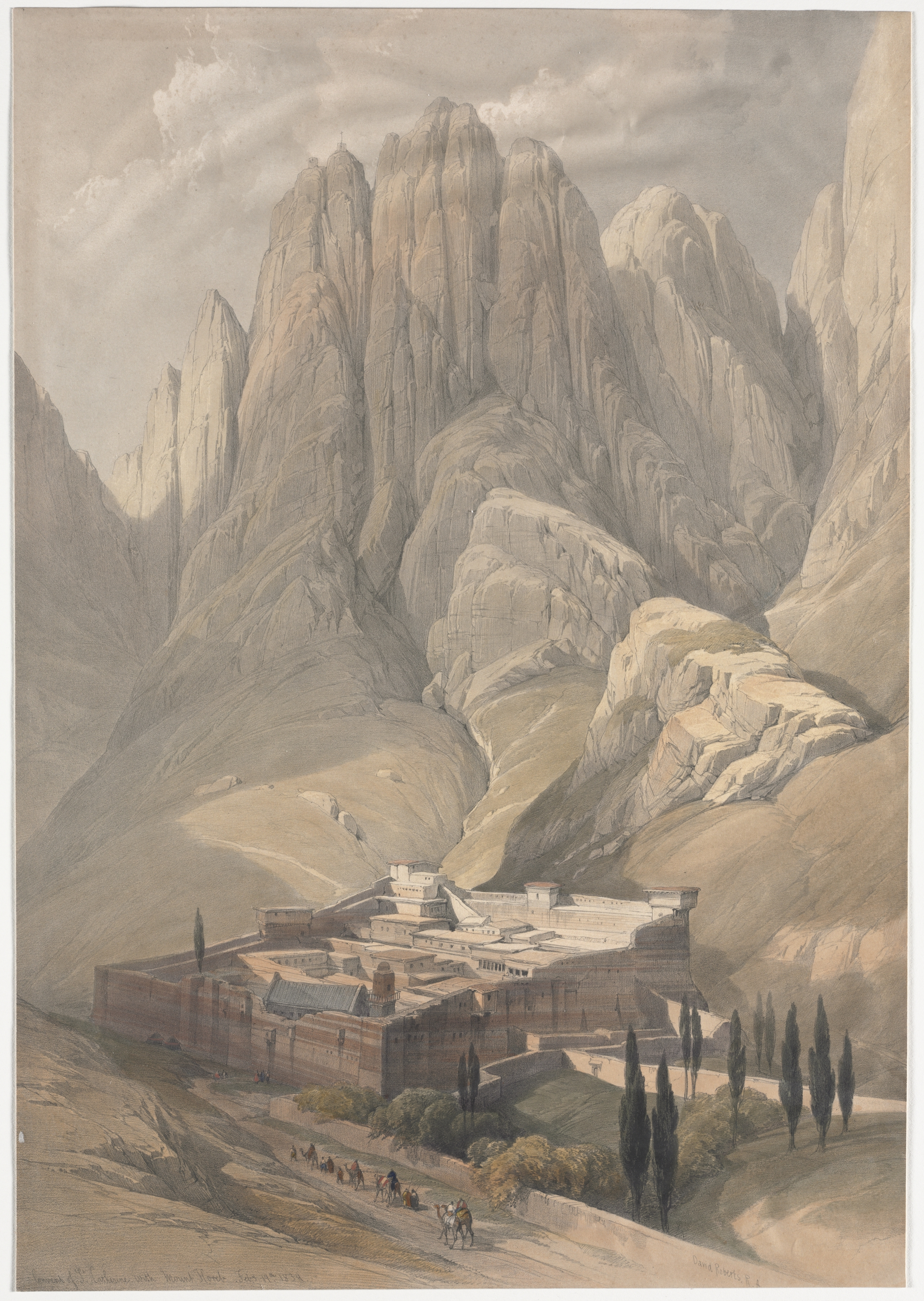
David Roberts (1839), published in The Holy Land, Syria, Idumea, Arabia, Egypt, and Nubia

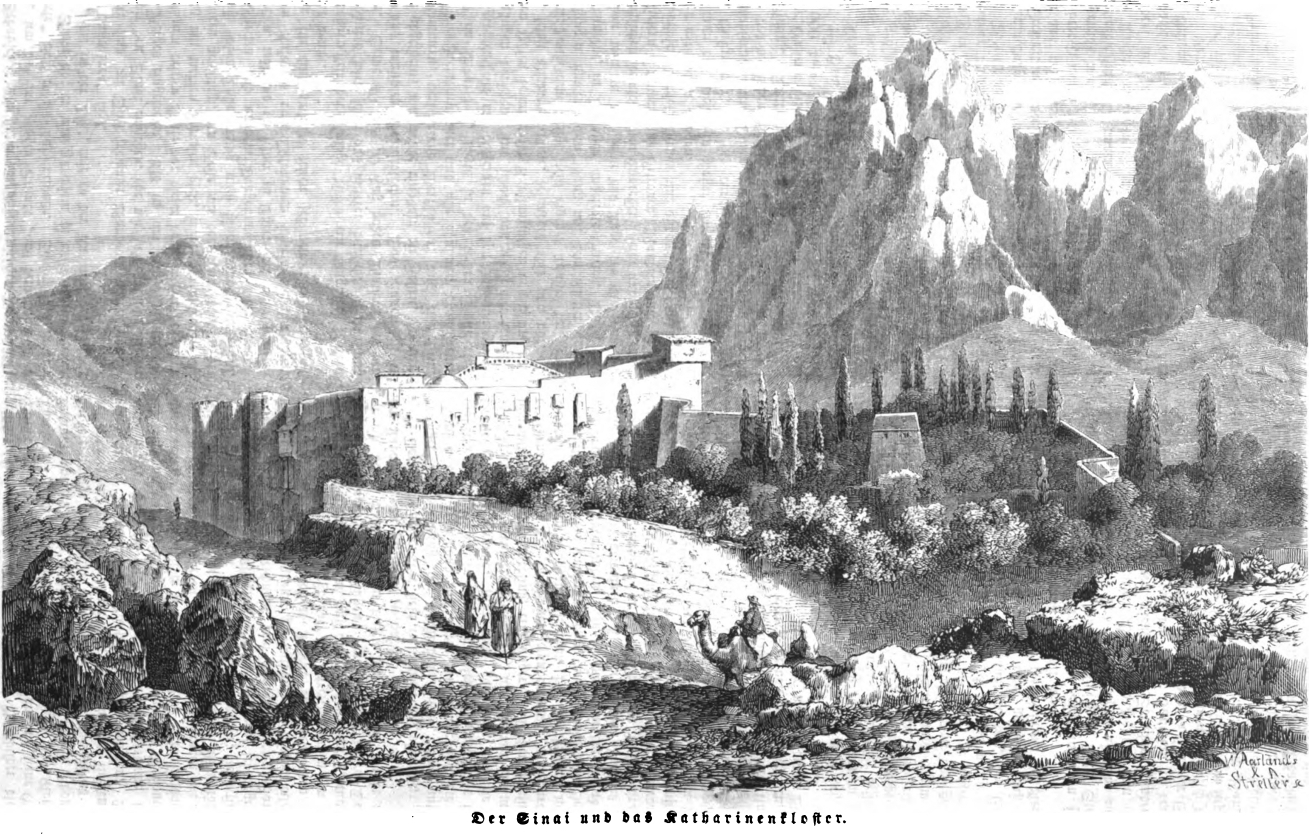
Ernst Keil (1861)

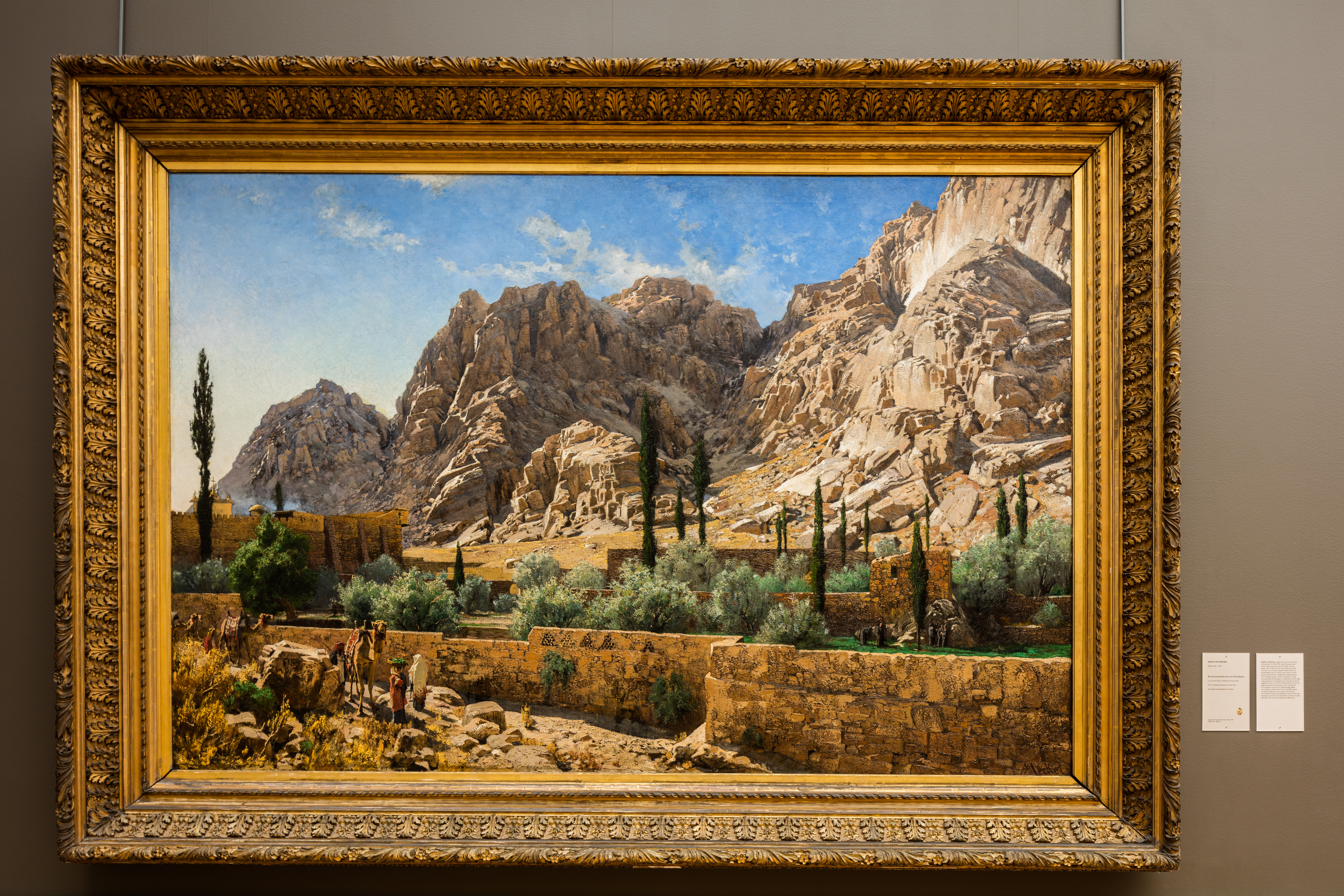
Adolf Meckel von Hemsbach (1892)

== Panoramic view ==
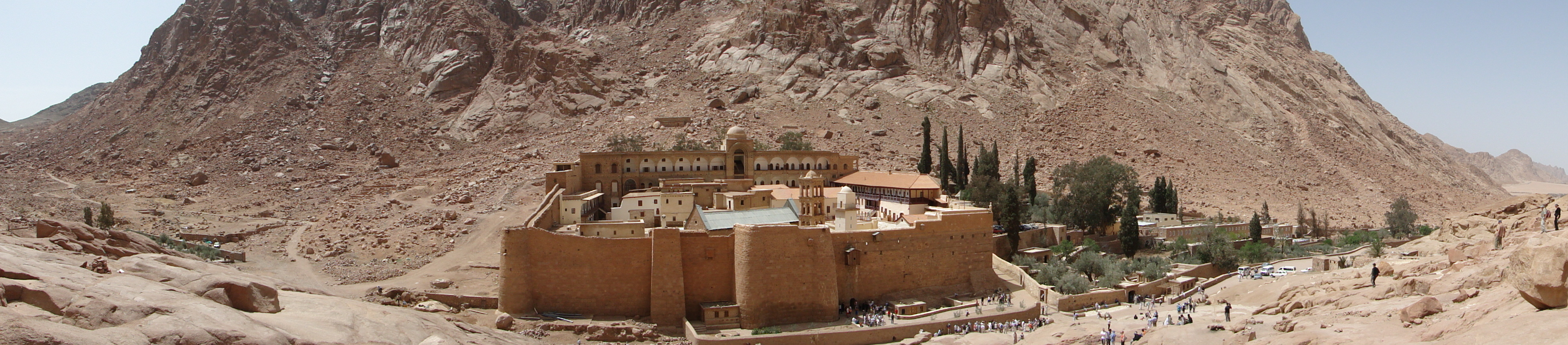
A panorama of St Catherine's Monastery

== In literature ==
The French novelist Pierre Loti describes the monastery and its treasures extensively in Le désert, his 1895 account of a journey on camelback through the Sinai desert.

== See also ==
- Archbishop of Mount Sinai and Raithu
- Ashtiname of Muhammad
- Caucasian Albanian script
- Charnel House
- Codex Climaci Rescriptus
- Codex Sinaiticus
- Codex Sinaiticus Rescriptus
- Cyril of Jerusalem
- Desert Fathers
- Gregory of Sinai
- John Climacus
- Ladder of Divine Ascent
- Oldest churches in the world
- Martyrs of Palestine
- Poustinia
- Sinaites in Serbia
- Syriac Sinaiticus
- Transitus Mariae
