= Church of Sinai =

Greek Orthodox autonomous church

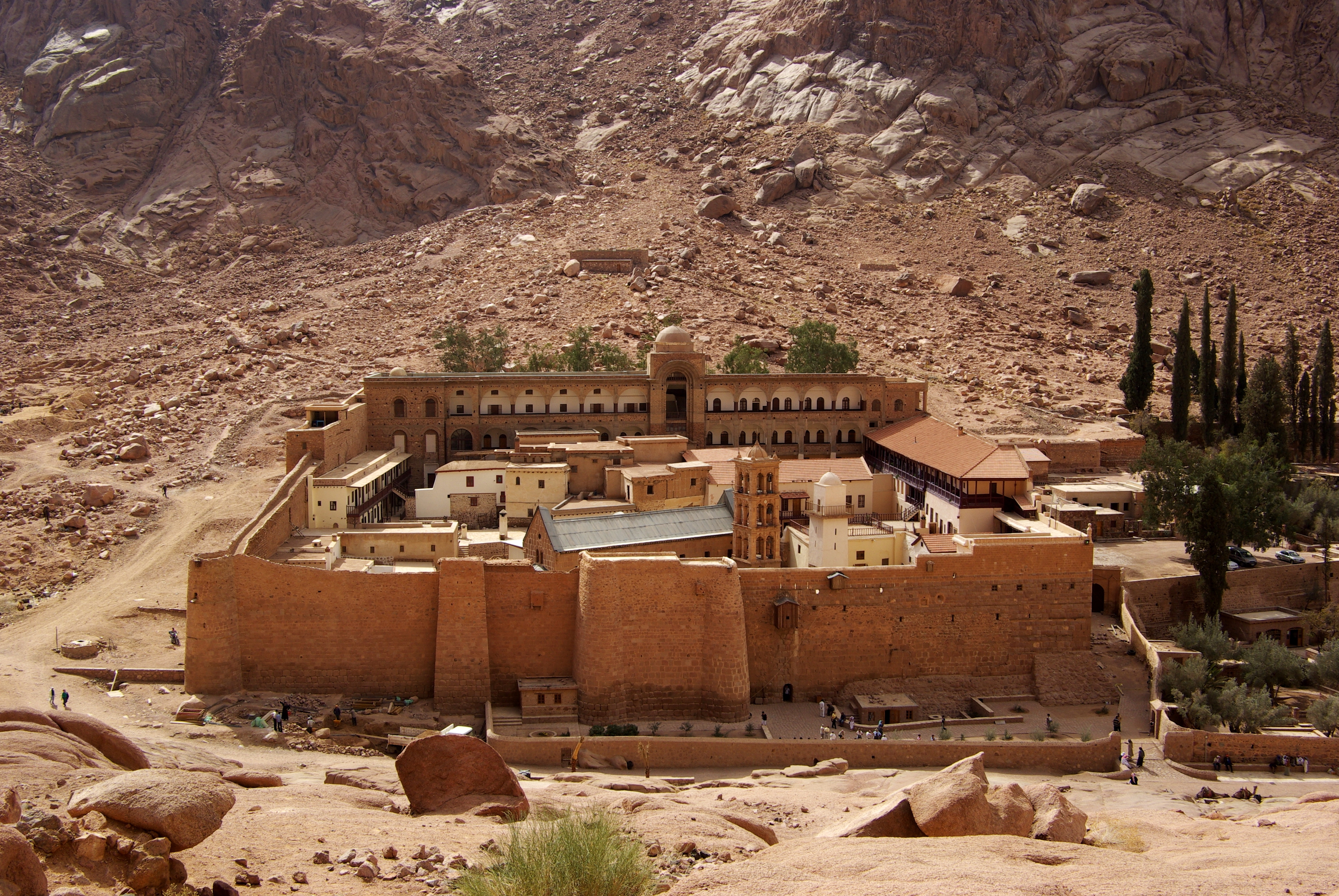
Saint Catherine's Monastery

The Church of Sinai is a Greek Orthodox autonomous church whose territory consists of St. Catherine's Monastery at the foot of Mount Sinai in Egypt, along with several dependencies. There is a dispute as to whether the church is fully autocephalous or merely autonomous. The church is headed by the Archbishop of Mount Sinai and Raithu, who is traditionally consecrated by the Greek Orthodox Patriarch of Jerusalem and also serves as abbot for the monastery. The current hierarch is Archbishop Symeon VI.

== History ==
The Church of Sinai owes its existence to the Monastery of the Transfiguration (better known as St. Catherine's Monastery). The monastery's origins are traced back to the Chapel of the Burning Bush that Constantine the Great's mother, Helena, had built over the site where Moses is supposed to have seen the burning bush. Between 527 and 565, Emperor Justinian I ordered the monastery built to enclose the chapel. The monastery became associated with St. Catherine of Alexandria through the belief that her relics were miraculously transported there.

St. Catherine's monastery, as it has been known since the 9th century, was originally part of the Patriarchate of Jerusalem, within the diocese of Pharan. After the bishop of Pharan was deposed for the heresy of monotheletism in AD 681, the see was transferred to the monastery itself, the abbot becoming the bishop of Pharan. With the subsequent union of the diocese of Raitho with the monastery, all the Christians in the Sinai peninsula came under the jurisdiction of the Abbot-Archbishop.

During the period of the Crusades, which was marked by bitterness between the Eastern Orthodox and Catholic churches, the monastery was patronized by both the Byzantine emperors and the rulers of the Kingdom of Jerusalem, and their respective courts.

In 1575, the Ecumenical Patriarchate of Constantinople granted Mount Sinai autonomous status. This was reaffirmed in 1782. The exact administrative status of the church within the Eastern Orthodox Church is ambiguous: by some, including the church itself, it is considered autocephalous, by others an autonomous church under the jurisdiction of the Greek Orthodox Church of Jerusalem. The archbishop is traditionally consecrated by the Greek Orthodox Patriarch of Jerusalem; in recent centuries he has usually resided in Cairo.

Today, in addition to the 20 or so monks in the monastic community, this church includes a few hundred Bedouins and fishermen who live in the Sinai. Since the Israeli invasion in 1967, perhaps the greatest problem facing the community has been maintaining an authentic monastic lifestyle while dealing with a massive influx of tourists. This problem has continued after the area's return to Egypt in 1982, and the population of the area has been increasing. Pope John Paul II visited the monastery on February 26, 2000.

== Features ==
The monastery's library is renowned for its great antiquity and its manuscripts. In 1859, Constantin von Tischendorf removed the Codex Sinaiticus from here. Today, it contains about 4,000 manuscripts, and some of the world's most ancient icons are also found in the monastery. The monastery was already outside the Eastern Roman Empire during the period of Byzantine Iconoclasm, when many icons in the empire were destroyed.

The monastery and library have a guest house and a hospital for the local population. The monks have also administered a school in Cairo since 1860. The monastery has historically had many dependent churches and monasteries in other countries. In 2006, there were: monasteries in Cairo, where the abbot often resides, and Alexandria, as well as nine in Greece, three in Cyprus, one in Lebanon and one in Istanbul.

== Locations of interest ==
- Monastery of the Temptation, Palestinian National Authority

== Sources ==
- Meyendorff, John (1989). Imperial unity and Christian divisions: The Church 450–680 A.D. The Church in history. Vol. 2. Crestwood, NY: St. Vladimir's Seminary Press. ISBN 9780881410563.
