= Mount Horeb =

Location in the Hebrew Bible

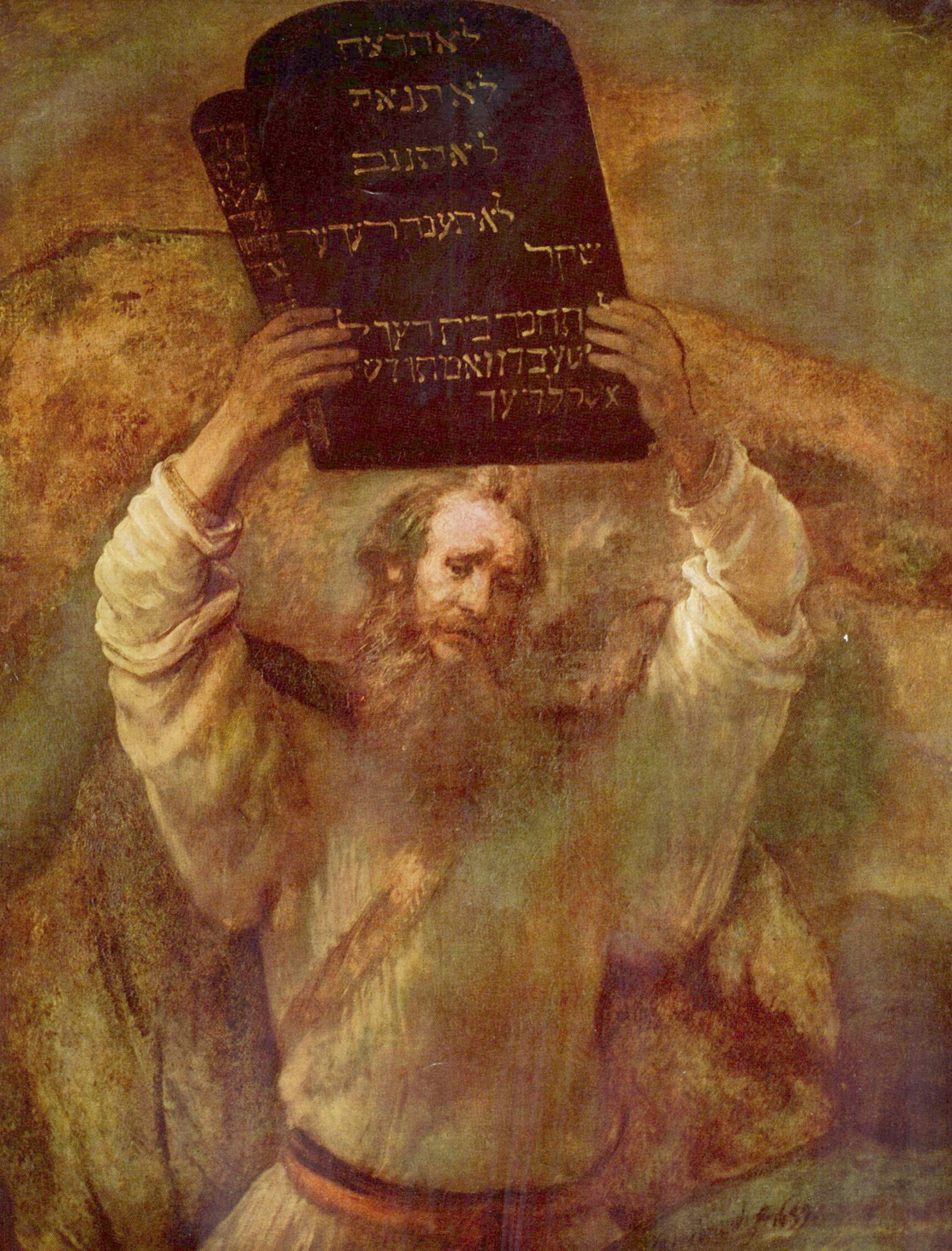
Moses with Tablets of the Ten Commandments, painting by Rembrandt, 1659

Mount Horeb (/ˈhɔːrɛb/; Hebrew: הַר חֹרֵב Har Ḥōrēḇ; Greek in the Septuagint: Χωρήβ, Chōrēb; Latin in the Vulgate: Horeb) is the mountain at which the Ten Commandments were given to Moses by God, according to the Book of Deuteronomy in the Hebrew Bible. It is described in two places (the Book of Exodus and the Books of Kings) as הַר הָאֱלֹהִים the "Mountain of Elohim". The mountain is also called the Mountain of YHWH.

In other biblical passages, these events are described as having transpired at Mount Sinai. Although most scholars consider Sinai and Horeb to have been different names for the same place, there is a minority body of opinion that they may have been different locations.

The Protestant reformer John Calvin took the view that Sinai and Horeb were the same mountain, with the eastern side of the mountain being called Sinai and the western side being called Horeb. Abraham Ibn Ezra suggested that there was one mountain, "only it had two tops, which bore these different names". Locally, around Saint Catherine's Monastery, which is built adjacent to the Egyptian Mount Sinai and to Willow Peak, the latter is considered to be the Biblical Mount Horeb.

== Etymology ==
"Horeb" is thought to mean dry place or glowing/heat, which seems to be a reference to the Sun, while Sinai may have derived from the name of Sin, the Ancient Mesopotamian religion deity of the Moon, and thus Sinai and Horeb would be the mountains of the Moon and Sun, respectively.

== Biblical usage ==
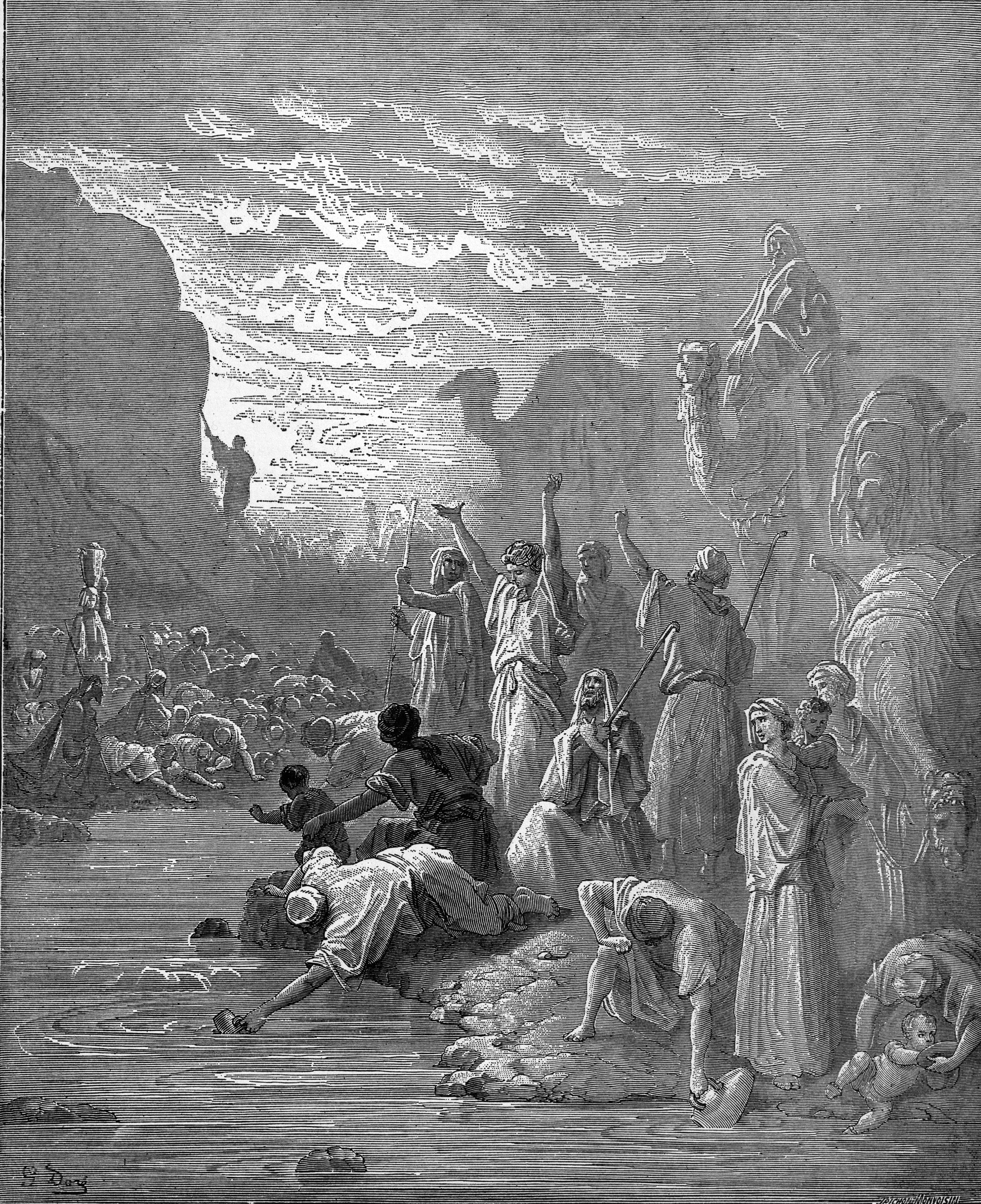
Moses Striking the Rock at Horeb, engraving by Gustave Doré from "La Sainte Bible", 1865

The name Horeb first occurs at Exodus 3:1, with the story of Moses and the burning bush. According to Exodus 3:5, the ground of the mountain was considered holy, and Moses was commanded by God to remove his sandals.

Exodus 17:6 describes the incident when the Israelites were in the wilderness without water. When Moses was "upon the rock at Horeb", he strikes the rock and obtains drinking water from the rock. Verse 7 goes on to say that Moses "called the name of the place Massah and Meribah, because of the contention of the children of Israel, and because they tempted the Lord, saying, 'Is the Lord among us or not?'"

The only other use of the name in Exodus is in chapter 33, where Horeb is the location where the Israelites stripped off their ornaments. This passage (i.e., Exodus 33:1–6) suggests that Horeb was the location from which the Israelites set off towards Canaan as they resumed their Exodus journey.

In Deuteronomy, Horeb is mentioned several times in the account of the wanderings of the Israelites in the wilderness. Moses recalled in Deuteronomy 1:6 that God had said to the Israelites at Horeb, "You have dwelt long enough at this mountain: turn and take your journey", confirming that Horeb was the location from which they set off towards Canaan.

Other mentions of Horeb in Deuteronomy are found in the account of the delivery to Moses of the Ten Commandments, and in subsequent references back to the occasion: Deuteronomy 4:10, 4:15, 5:2, 9:8, 18:16, and 28:69. There are similar references at Psalm 106 and Malachi 4:4. Deuteronomy 5:2 ("The Lord our God made a covenant with us in Horeb") creates the sense that the current generation to whom Moses was speaking had been present at Mount Horeb when Moses descended with the commandments, although "the individuals who [had been] present had all perished with the exception of Moses, Joshua, and Caleb. [The] nation survived, and as it was with the nation as an organic whole that the covenant had been made. It might be with propriety said that it was made with those whom Moses addressed at this time, inasmuch as they constituted the nation."

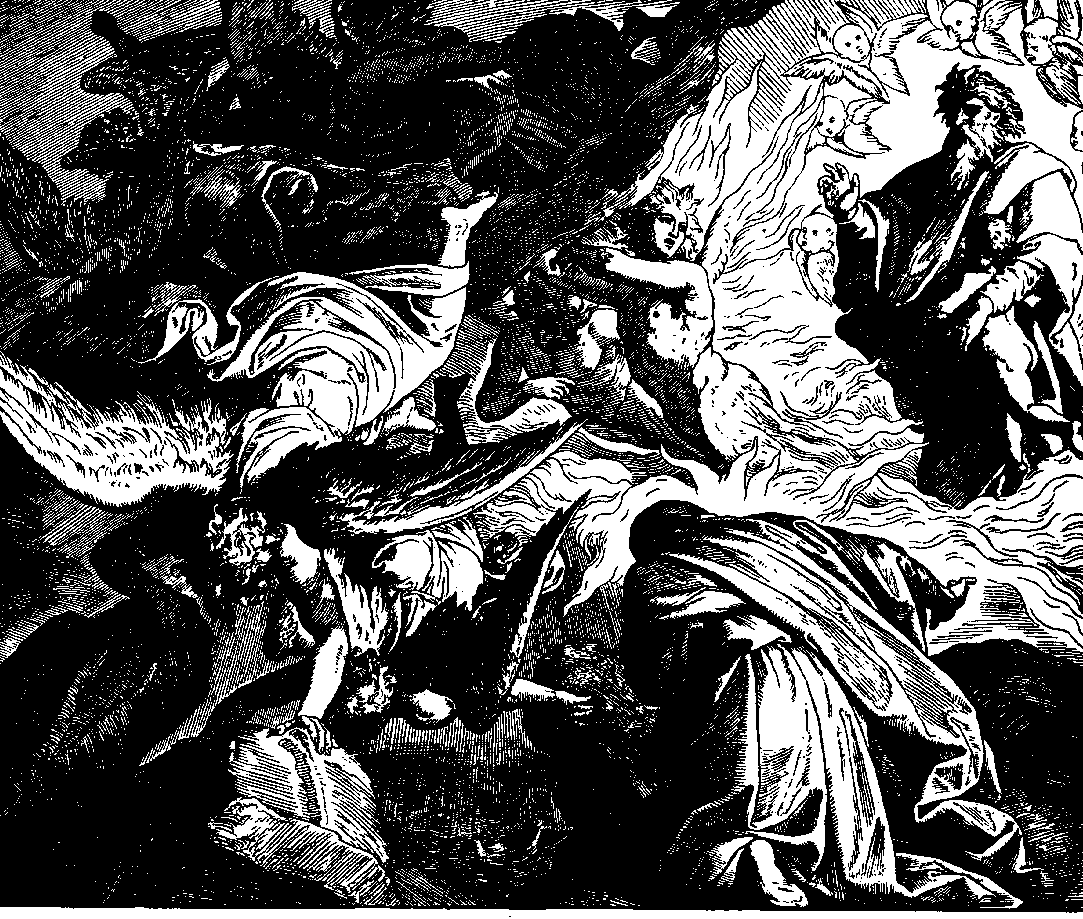
God Appears to Elijah on Mount Horeb, 1860 woodcut by Julius Schnorr von Karolsfeld

1 Kings 8:9 and 2 Chronicles 5:10 state that the Ark of the Covenant contained only the tablets delivered to Moses at Horeb. In 1 Kings 19:8-18, Elijah visits "Horeb the mount of God", and encounters God there.

According to the documentary hypothesis, the name Sinai is used in the Torah only by the Jahwist and Priestly Source from Judah, whereas Horeb is used only by the Elohist and Deuteronomist from Israel, which is part of the body of evidence for the hypothesis.

There are no references to Horeb in the New Testament. In Galatians 4:24–25, Mount Sinai is mentioned: "One covenant is from Mount Sinai and bears children who are to be slaves: This is Hagar. Now Hagar stands for Mount Sinai in Arabia and corresponds to the present city of Jerusalem, because she is in slavery with her children." Mount Sinai/Horeb is also alluded to in Hebrews 12:18–21.

== Location ==
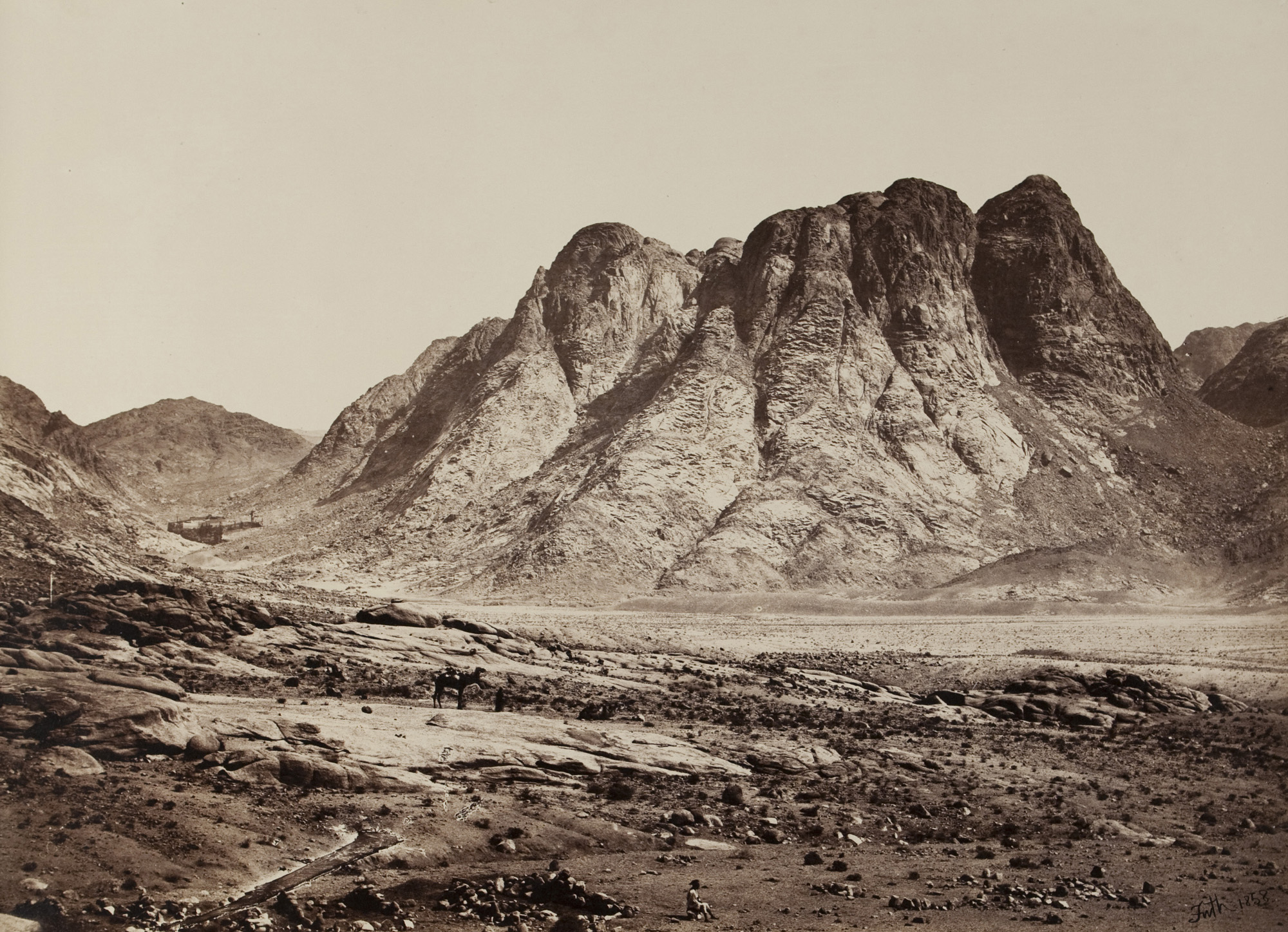
Mountain on the Sinai Peninsula identified by Francis Frith as Horeb

The location of Horeb is disputed. Jewish and Christian scholars have advanced varying opinions as to its whereabouts since biblical times. Elijah is described in 1 Kings 19:1–21 as traveling to Horeb (taking 40 days to walk there from Beersheba), in a way which implies that its position was familiar when that was written, but there are no biblical references set any later in time. Additionally the passage identifies a cave large enough to lodge in. Also in the beginning of Deuteronomy, where Moses delivers his last speech on the plains of Moab, the location is given to be 11 days to Horeb, which is already an indication that it is not Mount Sinai (ca 500 km distance). If Horeb was the same mountain as Mount Sinai, then Beersheba should be closer to the mountain than the location of the plains of Moab. This strongly suggests a location somewhere more to the north or the east, places more familiar to the northern tribes than the deep southern Sinai.

Christian tradition considers Mount Horeb to be Willow Peak, located adjacent to Saint Catherine's Monastery.

"Mt. Sinai has never been located".
