= Willow Peak =

Mountain peak in the Sinai Peninsula, Egypt

- Ras es-Safsafeh
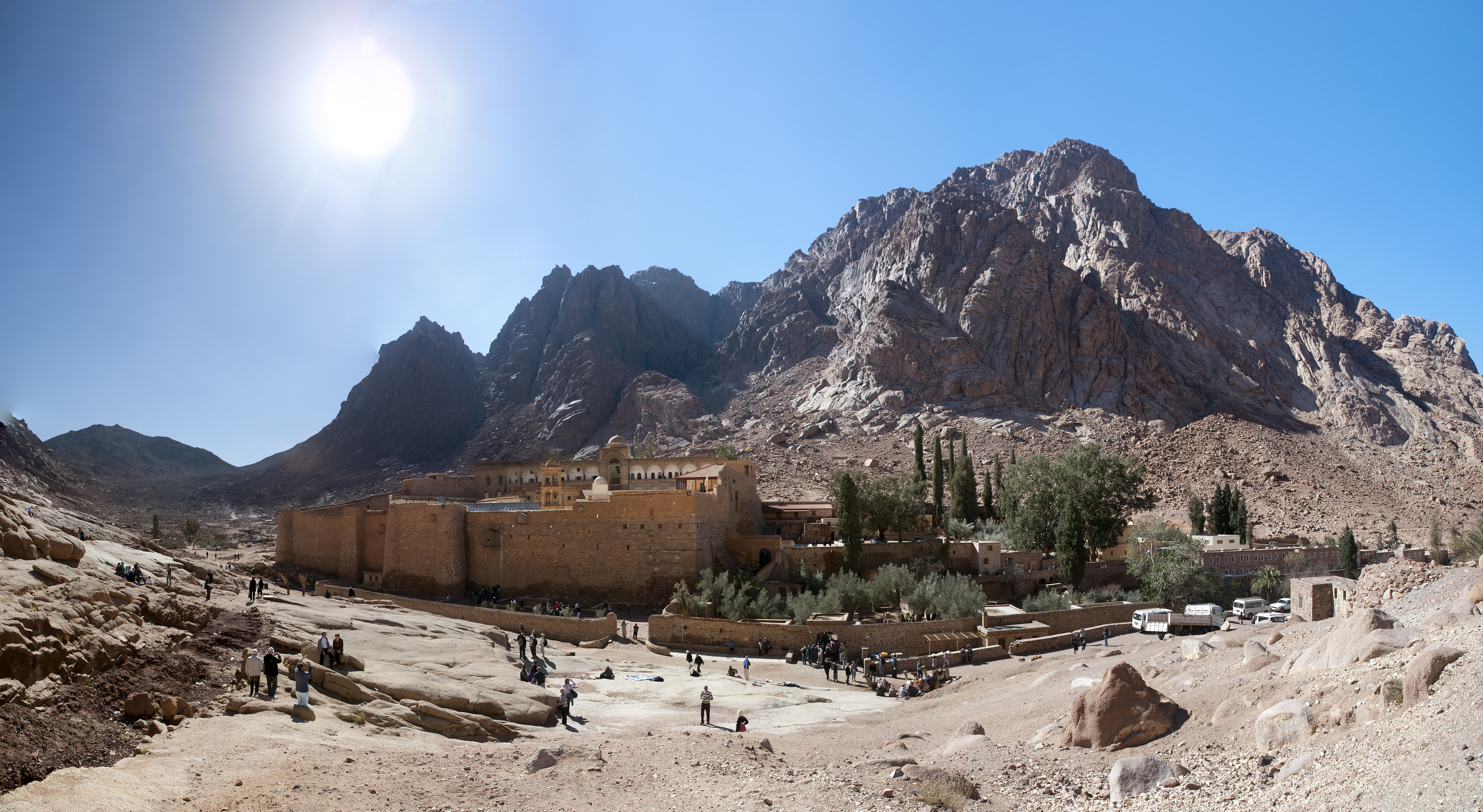
- Saint Catherine's monastery, with Willow Peak behind

Highest point
- Elevation: 1,970 m (6,460 ft)
- Coordinates: 28°33′20″N 33°58′02″E

Geography
- Location within Egypt
- Location: Egypt

Willow Peak or Ras es-Safsafeh (Arabic: رأس صفصافة) is a mountain in the Sinai Peninsula. The mountain peak overlooks Saint Catherine's Monastery, and is situated approximately 1km to the west.

Christian tradition considers the mountain to be the biblical Mount Horeb. Its proximity to Mount Sinai and Saint Catherine's Monastery contributed to its importance in Late Antiquity. While Mount Sinai itself was regarded as too sacred for permanent habitation, nearby mountains such as Ras es-Safsafeh became focal points for monastic settlement and pilgrimage.

== Archaeology ==
Archaeological surveys conducted in the late 20th century revealed a concentration of Byzantine-period monastic remains on Ras es-Safsafeh and in the surrounding valleys. These remains represent one of the densest assemblages of monastic sites in the Sinai Peninsula. The archaeological features include small monastic complexes and chapels; hermit cells built into caves and rock shelters; stone enclosures marking agricultural plots; dams, reservoirs, and aqueducts for water collection; and pathways, stairways, and revetments connecting valleys and ridges. The material evidence suggests continuous activity primarily between the 4th and 6th centuries CE.

The monastic buildings were generally modest in size, typically serving small groups of monks. Southern exposure was often preferred, likely to maximize sunlight during winter months. Pottery recovered from the sites includes both locally produced wares and imported Byzantine ceramics, indicating participation in trade networks.

Based on the number and distribution of monastic complexes, as well as the size of associated buildings and agricultural areas, researchers estimate that Ras es-Safsafeh may have supported over one hundred monks during the height of monastic activity in the 6th century CE. This estimate assumes that many of the structures were in use simultaneously.
