= Archbishop of Mount Sinai and Raithu =

The following is a list of Orthodox archbishops of Mount Sinai and Raithu (Greek: Αρχιεπίσκοπος Σινά και Ραϊθώ). The Church of Sinai is an autonomous (given that the archbishop, and abbot of the monastery, is elected by the assembly of the monks (Brotherhood of Sinai) but is ordained by the Greek Orthodox Patriarch of Jerusalem) body of the Orthodox Church of Jerusalem:

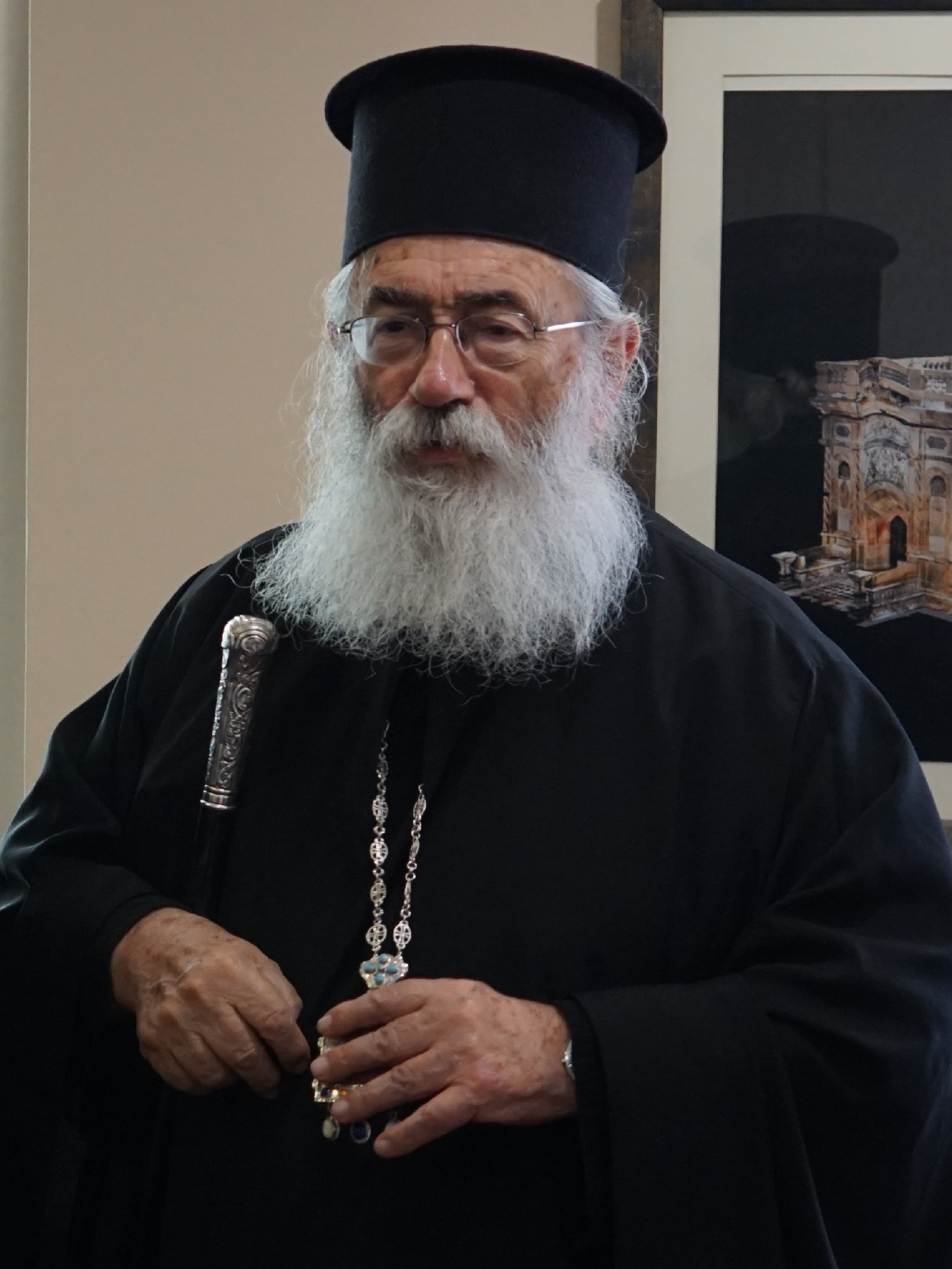
Archbishop of Sinai Damian, 10 Dec 1974 – 12 Sep 2025

- Eugenios (1567–1583)
- Anastasios (1583–1592)
- Laurentios (1592–1617)
- Ioasaf (1617–1661)
- Nektarios II (1661)
- Ananias (1661–1671)
- Ioannikios I (1671–1702)
- Kosmas (22 Apr 1703 – 13 Feb 1706)
- Athanasios IV (1708–1720)
- Ioannikios II (1721–1728)
- Nikiforos (1728–1747)
- Konstantios I (1748–1759)
- Kyrillos II (28 Oct 1759 – Jan/Feb 1790)
- Dorotheos II (1794–1797)
- Konstantios II (1804 – 9 Jul 1859)
- Kyrillos III (7 Dec 1859 – 5 Sep 1867)
- Kallistratos (1867–1884)
- Porphyrios I (21 Aug 1885 – 7 May 1904)
- Porphyrios II (7 May 1904 – Jul 1926)
- Porphyrios III (29 Jul 1926 – 24 Nov 1968)
- Grigorios II (4 Jan 1969 – 11 Sep 1974)
- Damianos I (10 Dec 1974 – 12 Sep 2025) (resigned)
- Symeon VI (14 Sep 2025 - now)

== Sources ==
- Rulers.org: Orthodox Churches
- The Hierarchs Catalog of Monastery St. Catherine form Sinai
- Adrian Marinescu, Catalogul intaistatatorilor de la Muntele Sinai
