= Wilderness of Sin =

Geographic area mentioned in the Bible

The wilderness of Sin or desert of Sin (Hebrew: מִדְבַּר סִין Mīḏbar Sīn) is a geographic area mentioned in the Hebrew Bible as lying between Elim and Mount Sinai. Sin does not refer to the moral concept of "sin", but comes from the Hebrew word Sîn, the Hebrew name for this region.

The location the Bible refers to is unknown, as its determination relies heavily on the location of Mount Sinai. The traditional Christian Orthodox identification of Mount Sinai as Jabal Musa (one of the peaks at the southern tip of the Sinai Peninsula) would imply that the wilderness of Sin was probably the narrow plain of el-Markha, which stretches along the eastern shore of the Red Sea for several miles toward the promontory of Ras Mohammed; however, some scholars have since rejected these traditional identifications. Another identification among some modern scholars, of Sinai as al-Madhbah at Petra, would imply that the wilderness of Sin was roughly equatable with the central Arabah.

The wilderness of Sin is mentioned by the Bible as being one of the places through which the Israelites wandered during their Exodus journey; the similarly named wilderness of Zin is also mentioned by the Bible as having been a location through which the Israelites travelled. The biblical narrative states that on reaching the wilderness of Sin, the Israelites began to complain of the lack of food, as they had already consumed all the grain they had brought with them from Egypt. According to the account, Yahweh heard their murmurings, and so provided them with abundant manna and quail.

Later they left the wilderness of Sin and complained about a lack of water while camping at Rephidim.
