= Zin Desert =

Levantine location

Coordinates: 30.971°N 35.325°E

The Wilderness is in the south

The Wilderness of Zin or the Desert of Zin (Hebrew: מדבר צין, Mīḏbar Ṣīn) is a geographic term with two meanings, one biblical and one modern Israeli, which are not necessarily identical.

== Biblical deserts ==
=== Desert of Zin ===
The Desert of Zin is an area mentioned by the Torah as containing Kadesh-Barnea (Numbers 27:14; Numbers 33:36), and it is therefore also referred to as the "Wilderness of Kadesh" (Psalms 29:8).

=== Desert of Sin ===
Similarly named is the Wilderness of Sin. Modern English translations make a distinction, but it is not easily evident from the Septuagint and the Vulgate which, apart from a couple of instances, render both Hebrew ṣīn and sîn as "Sin". The "Wilderness of Sin" is mentioned by the Bible as being adjacent to Mount Sinai; some consider Sinai to refer to al-Madhbah at Petra, adjacent to the central Arabah, and it is thus eminently possible that the "Wilderness of Sin" and the "Wilderness of Zin" are the same place.

=== Identification ===
As of 1899, most scholars, as well as traditional sources, identified the Wilderness of Zin as being part of the Aravah.

== Modern Desert of Zin ==
Modern Israel has adopted the name for a specific southern desert area, which might or might not be identical with the biblical Wilderness of Zin.

It was this region that the British Arabist and adventurer T. E. Lawrence was exploring in a military survey for the British army when he was drafted into service. His expedition, funded by the Palestine Exploration Fund, included a survey of the entire Negev Desert.

== Important Bird Area ==
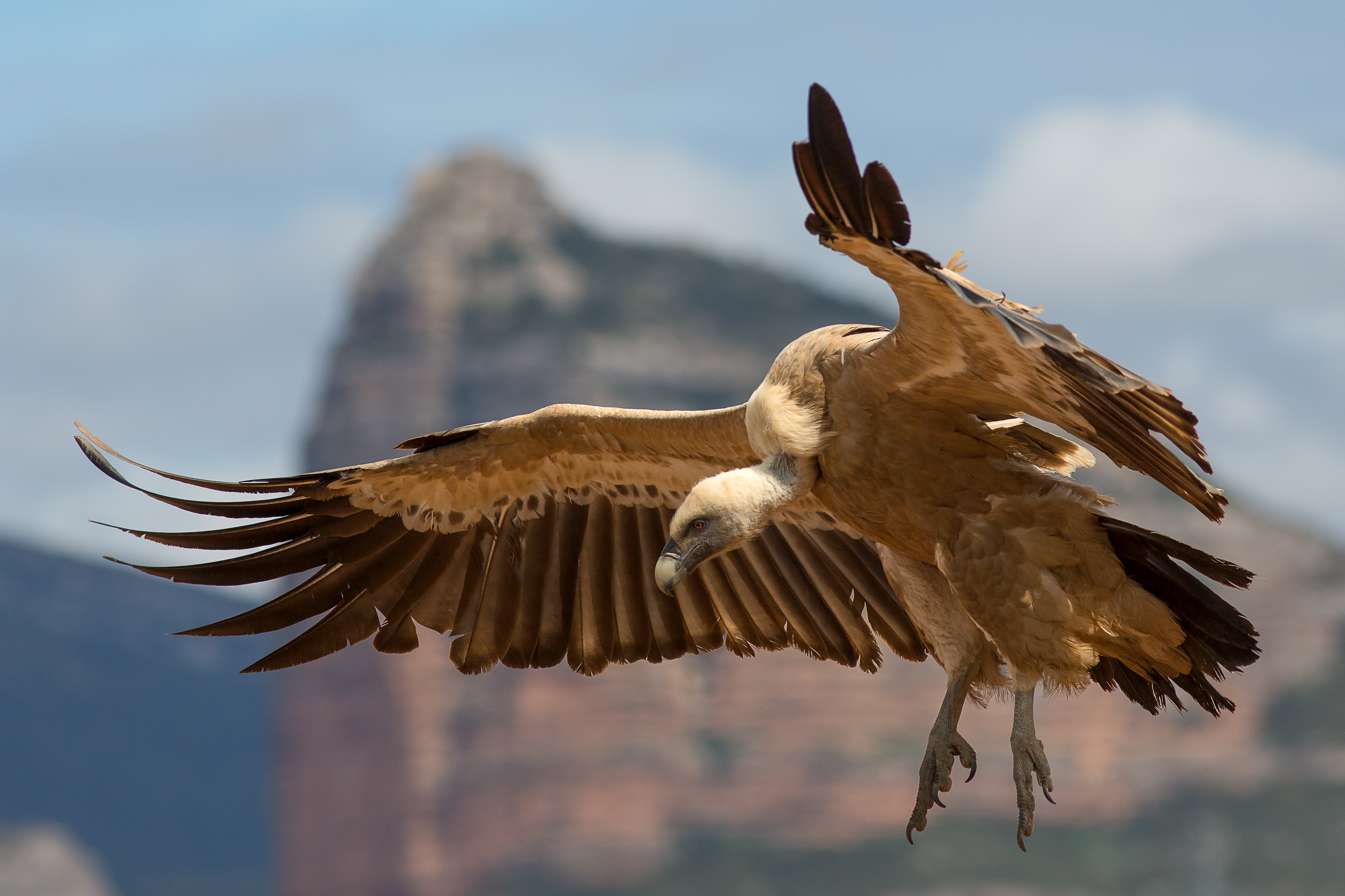
Griffon vultures breed in the IBA

A 25,000 ha (62,000-acre) tract of Israel's "Zin Desert" area near Sede Boqer, 50 km (30 mi) south of Be'er Sheva and some 300–600 m (1,000–2,000 ft) above sea-level, has been recognised as the Cliffs of Zin and Negev Highlands Important Bird Area (IBA) by BirdLife International. Significant bird populations for which the IBA was designated include sand partridges, common cranes, MacQueen's bustards, black and white storks, pallid scops owls, desert tawny owls, Egyptian and griffon vultures, sooty and lanner falcons, Arabian babblers, hooded wheatears and Sinai rosefinches.

== Bibliography ==
- Woolley, C. Leonard and Lawrence, T. E., The Wilderness of Zin. Rev. 3rd ed. (Winona Lake, Eisenbrauns, in association with Stacey International, London, 2003).
