= Claude Scudamore Jarvis =

British colonial governor and journalist (1879–1953)

Major Claude Scudamore Jarvis
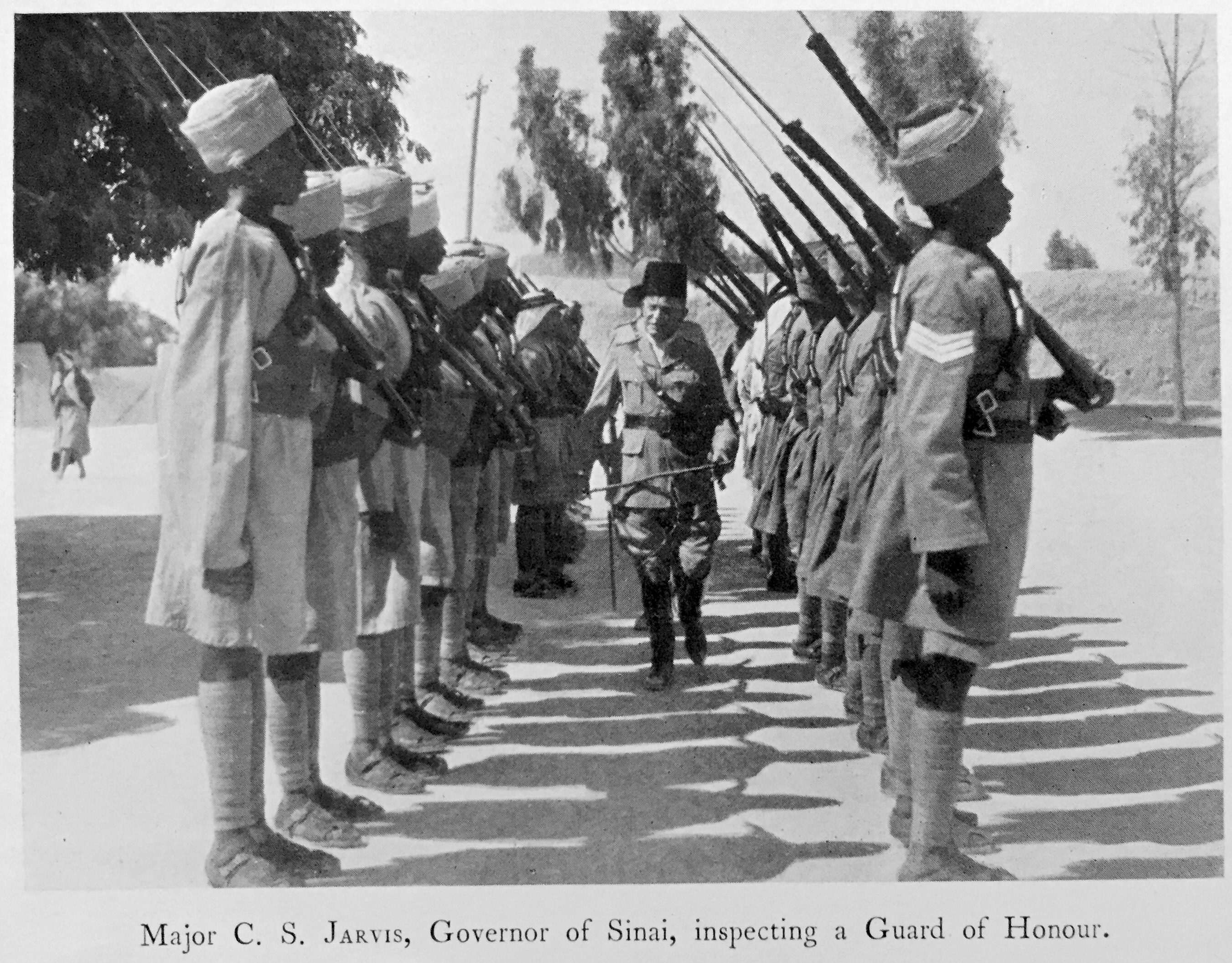
- Major C. S. Jarvis, Governor of Sinai, inspecting a Guard of Honour.
- Born: Claude Scudamore Jarvis; 20 July 1879; Forest Gate, Essex (now London), England
- Died: 8 December 1953 (aged 74); Ringwood, Hampshire, England

Major Claude Scudamore Jarvis CMG OBE (20 July 1879 – 8 December 1953) was a British colonial governor. As an Arabist and naturalist, he became noted for his knowledge of the desert Bedouin and for his rapport with them.

== Life and career ==
The son of John Bradford Jarvis, an insurance clerk, and his wife, Mary Harvey, he joined the merchant navy in 1896, then volunteered for British imperial service in the Second Boer War in 1899. Following his return from the war, he was in April 1902 appointed a second lieutenant in the 3rd (Dorset Militia) Battalion, Dorset Regiment.

He married Mabel Jane Hodson, daughter of a member of the US embassy staff in London, in 1903. They had one daughter. Jarvis then combined part-time military service in Ireland with freelance journalism until the First World War broke out.

Jarvis's interest in Arabs and the Arabic language grew from wartime army service in Palestine and Egypt, then a British protectorate. He was seconded to the new Egyptian frontiers administration by the British high commissioner, Sir Reginald Wingate, serving first in the Western desert and then in Sinai. His Arabic and knowledge of Bedouin customs allowed him as governor of Sinai from 1923 to intercede successfully in local disputes and to clamp down on banditry and drug trafficking. He also traced the remains of a Roman and Byzantine settlement in northern Sinai, and by damming the local Wadi Gedeirat and restoring the stone channels succeeded in recreating an oasis. He wrote of governance in Western Egypt:

The Coastguards had policed the Western Desert and Red Sea District; and the [Ministry of the] Interior had functioned in the oases of Kharga, Dakhla, Bahariya, and Farafra; whilst the Ministries of Justice, Finance, Health, Education, etc., had all supplied officials to perform their various duties.

In 1933, Governor of Sinai Jarvis was appointed an Officer of the Order of the British Empire. The King of Egypt had early in 1931 awarded him with the Insignia of the Third Class of the Order of the Nile.

Jarvis took early retirement in 1936 and was appointed a Companion of the Order of St Michael and St George (CMG). He then devoted himself to natural history, writing and farming. He joined the staff of the magazine Country Life in 1939, contributing a column, A Countryman's Notes, for 14 years. He was awarded the Lawrence Medal by the Royal Central Asian Society in 1938. In 1938, in an article for the Palestine Exploration Quarterly, Jarvis proposed Mount Helal as the biblical Mount Sinai. He died at his Ringwood home, Chele Orchard, on 8 December 1953.

== Partial bibliography ==
- Yesterday and To-day in Sinai (Edinburgh/London: W. Blackwood & Sons, 1931)
- Three Deserts. Experiences in Egypt (London: John Murray, 1936)
- Oriental Spotlight. A humorous guide to travel in the East, under the pseudonym Rameses (London: John Murray, 1937)
- Desert and Delta. An account of modern Egypt (London: John Murray, 1938)
- The Back Garden of Allah (London: John Murray, 1939)
- Through Crusader Lands (London: Pitman's Travel Series, 1939)
- Arab Command. The biography of Lieutenant-Colonel F. W. Peake Pasha (London: Hutchinson & Co., 1942)
- Scattered Shots (London: John Murray, 1942)
- Heresies and Humours (London: Country Life, 1943)
- Half a Life. Reminiscences (London: John Murray, 1943)
- Happy Yesterdays (London: Country Life, 1948)
- Gardener's Medley (London: Country Life, 1951)
- Innocent Pursuits (London: John Murray, 1953).
- Six articles by Jarvis appeared in the Royal Central Asian Journal in 1935–1939. He also wrote for Antiquity in 1932–1940.
- Jarvis's views on the wanderings of the Biblical Israelites in Sinai appear in C. S. Jarvis (1938), "The forty years' wandering of the Israelites", Palestine Exploration Quarterly, pp. 25–40
