= Mount Helal =

Mountain in North Sinai Governorate, Egypt

Jabal al-Halal

Highest point
- Elevation: 910 m (2,990 ft)
- Coordinates: 30°39′10.8″N 34°01′43.9″E

Naming
- Language of name: Arabic

Geography
- Location: North Sinai Governorate, Egypt

Jabal al-Halāl (Arabic:جبل الحلال) is a mountain in the North Sinai Governorate of Egypt. At 910 meters above sea level, it is the highest mountain of the Khashm ar-Rih range.

== History ==
The mountain is located 60 km south of al-Arish. It was named "Halal" because of the camels and sheep that used to graze around the mountain. The residents of the mountain are the Tarabin and Tiyaha tribes. The mountain has long been a refuge of smugglers and bandits and has been described as 'controlled by Bedouin outlaws'. According to Ibrahim Hammad, the Bedouin chief of Bir al-Abed, "This mountain is like a ghost area. It hasn't been attacked by outsiders even in the worst security conditions." The area has many land mines.

It is thought by some, including Claude Scudamore Jarvis, to be the biblical Mount Sinai.

The perception of the mountain as a notorious hideout for terrorists began in 2004 after the 2004 Sinai bombings. Between 2004 and 2005, the Egyptian Armed Forces conducted months-long security operations here. In 2012, the Egyptian Armed Forces launched "Operation Eagle" in another attempt to root out militants hiding on the mountain after the August 2012 Sinai attack.

In March/April 2017, the Egyptian Armed Forces conducted a third security operation named 'Torrent 5' in which they claimed to have cleared the mountain of terrorist hideouts.
