= Mount Serbal =

Mountain in Egypt

- From the northeast

Highest point
- Elevation: 2,070 m (6,790 ft)
- Prominence: 1,047 m (3,435 ft)
- Listing: Ribu
- Coordinates: 28°38′47″N 33°39′6″E

Geography

Mount Serbal (Arabic: Jebel Serbal, جبل سربال) is a mountain located in Wadi Feiran in southern Sinai. At 2,070 metres (6,791 ft) high, it is the fifth highest mountain in Egypt. It is part of the St. Catherine National Park. It is thought by some to be the Biblical Mount Sinai. Among others, this was claimed by Ludwig Schneller because it fits best with the biblical tradition, taking into account the route and speed of the Israelites and the surroundings of the mountain, as Rephidim is identified with Wadi Feiran.

There were many granite dwellings on Mount Serbal which were inhabited by anchorites in early Christian times, and there are traces of a fourth-century monastery close to its base. It is likely that the many inscriptions (some in Greek) found on rocks at the foot of Mount Serbal and the path up to its peak date from these times. One spot on the path is called Mokatteb, or the valley of writing.

Mount Serbal as seen from due north. Mount Serbal is in the center of the background.
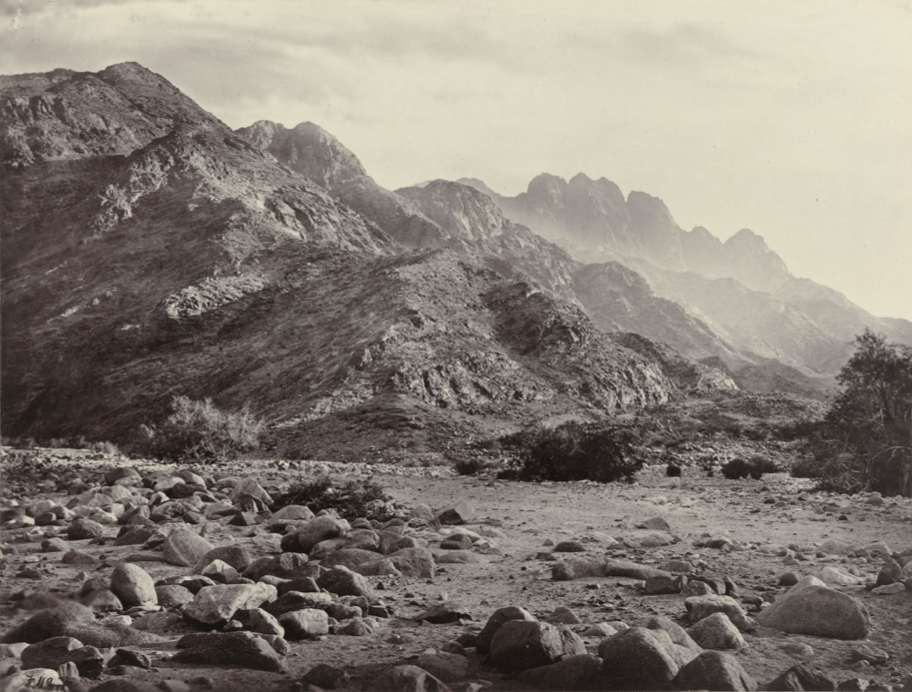
From due north

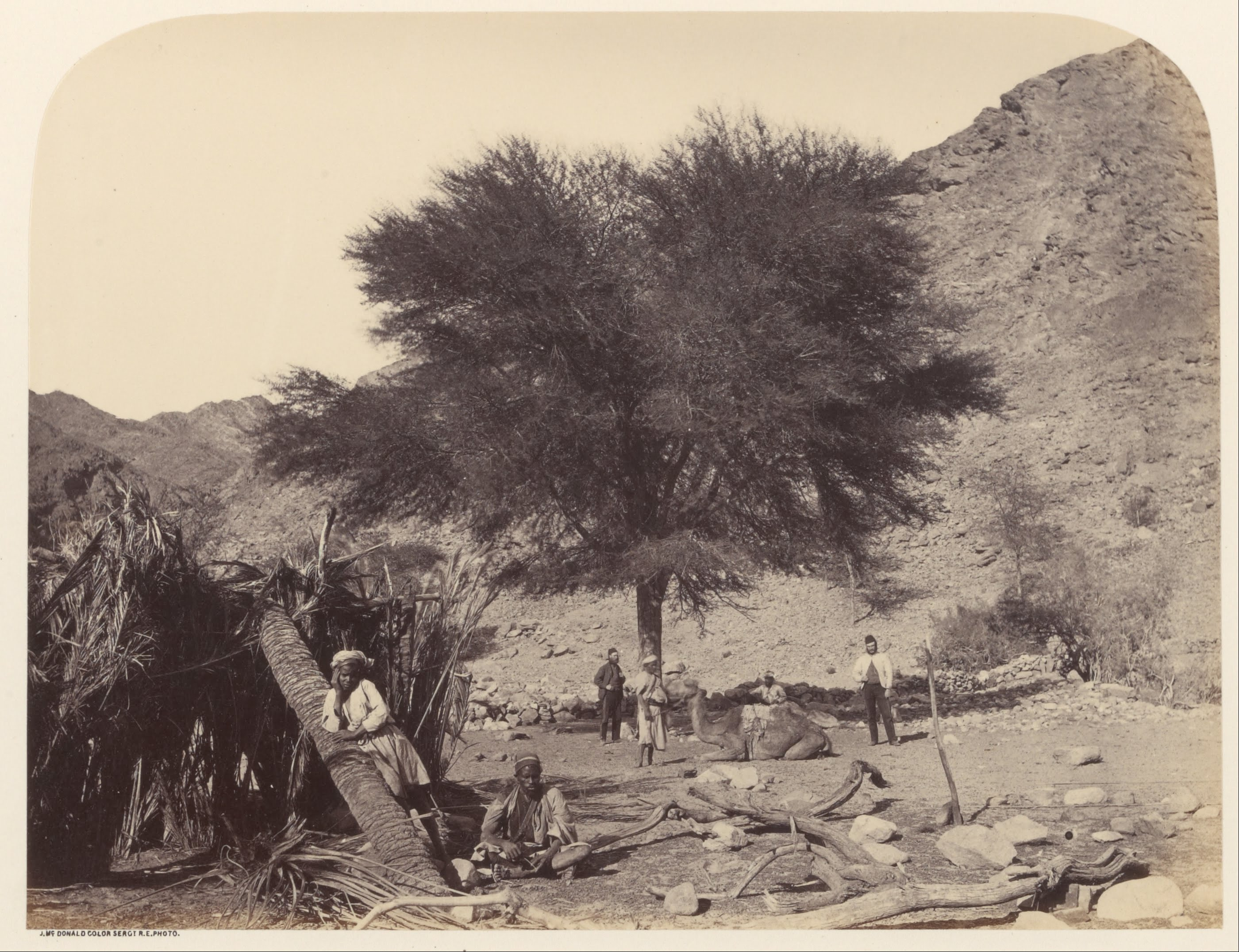
Shittah tree, dedicated to the Patron Saint, Wady Feiran

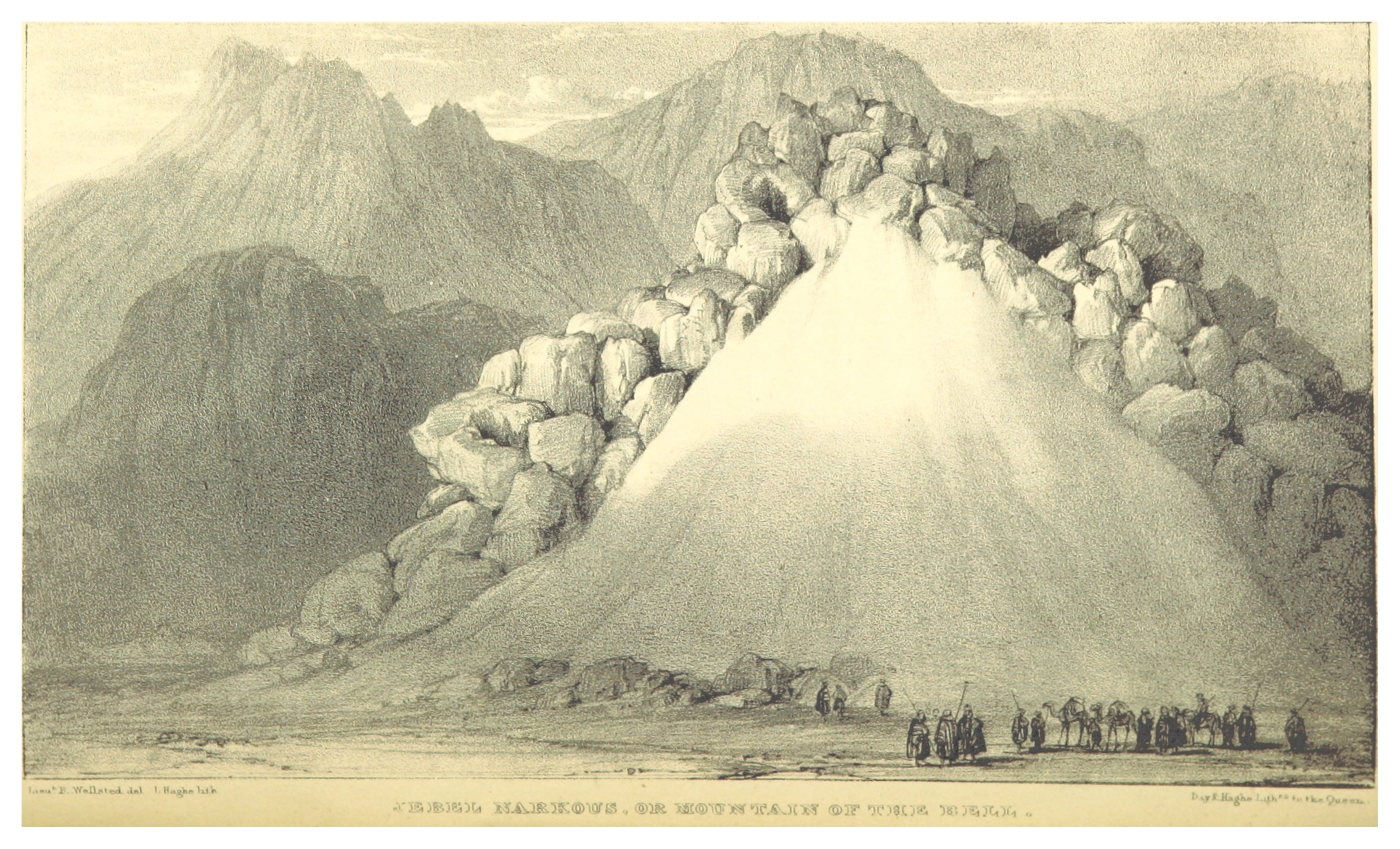
Southern Sinai Peninsula, Gebel Nakús or the Mountain of the Bell (1838)

== See also ==
- Saint Katherine city
