= Hashem El Tarif =

Mountain in northeastern Sinai Peninsula

Coordinates: 29°40′9.18″N 34°38′0.28″E

Hashem El Tarif is a mountain on the Sinai Peninsula, now in northeastern Egypt. It is one of several candidates for the biblical Mount Sinai, where the Abrahamic prophet Moses received the Ten Commandments. It stands 881 meters tall.

== Mount Sinai claims ==
Hashem El Tarif is one of several proposed locations of the biblical Mount Sinai.

=== The Exodus Decoded ===
The James Cameron-produced History Channel special, The Exodus Decoded, suggests that this location, now in an Egyptian military zone, is the best candidate for the biblical Mount Sinai. The program claims that it not only features "biblical geographical" clues, but that it also possesses three important traits described in the Book of Exodus:

1. A cleft that overlooks a natural amphitheatre, from which a speaker could have been observed and heard from a great distance.
2. A plateau below the cleft large enough to have held several hundred thousand people and to have contained enough vegetation to sustain large flocks. The plateau also contains one of the largest concentrations of ancient open-air fire pits in the region (many still visible as ruins), as well as many graves.
3. Calcium deposits that provide evidence of an ancient spring (now dry) which was located on the top of the mountain - a fairly rare geological feature.

Another argument used in the documentary to strengthen the claim that Hashem El Tarif is the biblical Mount Sinai is that in the Bible Mount Sinai is described as a "holy mountain", and Hashem El Tarif contains several ancient stone shrines all around it, as well as graves of apparently prominent persons near its summit. The final argument in favor of Hashem El Tarif is the fact that the traditional Mount Sinai (Jebel Musa) is devoid of any of the above and surrounded by a granite plateau unsuitable for herding sheep. According to the documentary, though, despite all this evidence, permission for archeological excavation was not granted to them by the Egyptian military, which the documentary claims closely guards and restricts access to the mountain.

=== The Naked Archaeologist ===
Simcha Jacobovici in an episode of The Naked Archaeologist explored several mountains as possible candidates for the biblical Mount Sinai. Potential candidates had to meet the following criteria:

1. The mountain must have at its base a large plateau that could accommodate hundreds of thousands of biblical Israelites.
2. It must have a water source to support the people camping at the foot of the mountain.
3. It must be accessible and easy to climb (due to the old age of Moses).
4. It must have symbols of worship; archaeological evidence proving that the mountain was "holy" even before the time of Moses. (He claims the plateau of Hashem El Tarif contains 33 open-air sanctuaries; the largest number of open-air sanctuaries next to a mountain in the eastern Sinai ever found.)
5. It must be located somewhere along the ancient route of the Exodus.
6. It must have a natural spring at its top.

In addition to these criteria, Jacobovici claimed that, according to biblical text, the mountain must also:

1. Be a fourteen-day journey from "Elim" (Exodus 16:1). For a mass of people, a days journey was assumed to be 15 km per day. A fourteen-day journey would be about 210 km.
2. Be an eleven-day journey from Kadesh Barnea (Deuteronomy 1:2), approximately 165 km.
3. Be within "goat grazing distance" of Midianite territory. Moses was tending his father-in-law's goats at the time of his first encounter on Mount Sinai (Exodus 3). Based on modern Bedouin practises, this was assumed to be 45 to 60 or 70 km from a camp (or further in the event of drought). Midianite pottery and art have been found at Timna, assumed to be the only Midianite enclave in the Sinai.

Using these points of reference to triangulate possible locations, Jacobovici claims that Hashem El Tarif is the most likely candidate for the biblical Mount Sinai.

== Criticisms ==
The hypothesis that this mountain is the original Mount Sinai has faced criticism. Some of the arguments against the proposal that Hashem El Tarif is Mount Sinai are as follows:

1. There is no mention in history of Hashem El Tarif, nor any well-known local tradition pointing to it as Mount Sinai.
2. There is no widespread Rabbinic-era Jewish tradition about the location of Mount Sinai. It does not seem to have been an important part of Jewish identity, and was a more distinctly Christian phenomenon. (Dr. Kerkeslager does state that there is evidence of early Christian traditions for Mount Sinai in northwestern Saudi Arabia at Jabal al-Lawz and Jabal Maqla, though).
3. As a part of the greater criticism of the Peninsula location for Mount Sinai, another criticism is that the Peninsula was likely controlled by the ancient Egyptian Empire at the time of the Exodus, with garrisons being placed throughout the Peninsula to protect the valuable copper and turquoise mines. Further, according to the book of Exodus, Moses came to Mount Sinai at the burning bush when he still resided in Midian. The land of Midian is largely recognized as the northwest portion of modern Saudi Arabia.
