= Jabal Ahmad al Baqir =

- Jabal Bāqir; Jebel Baggir; Jebel Bâkir
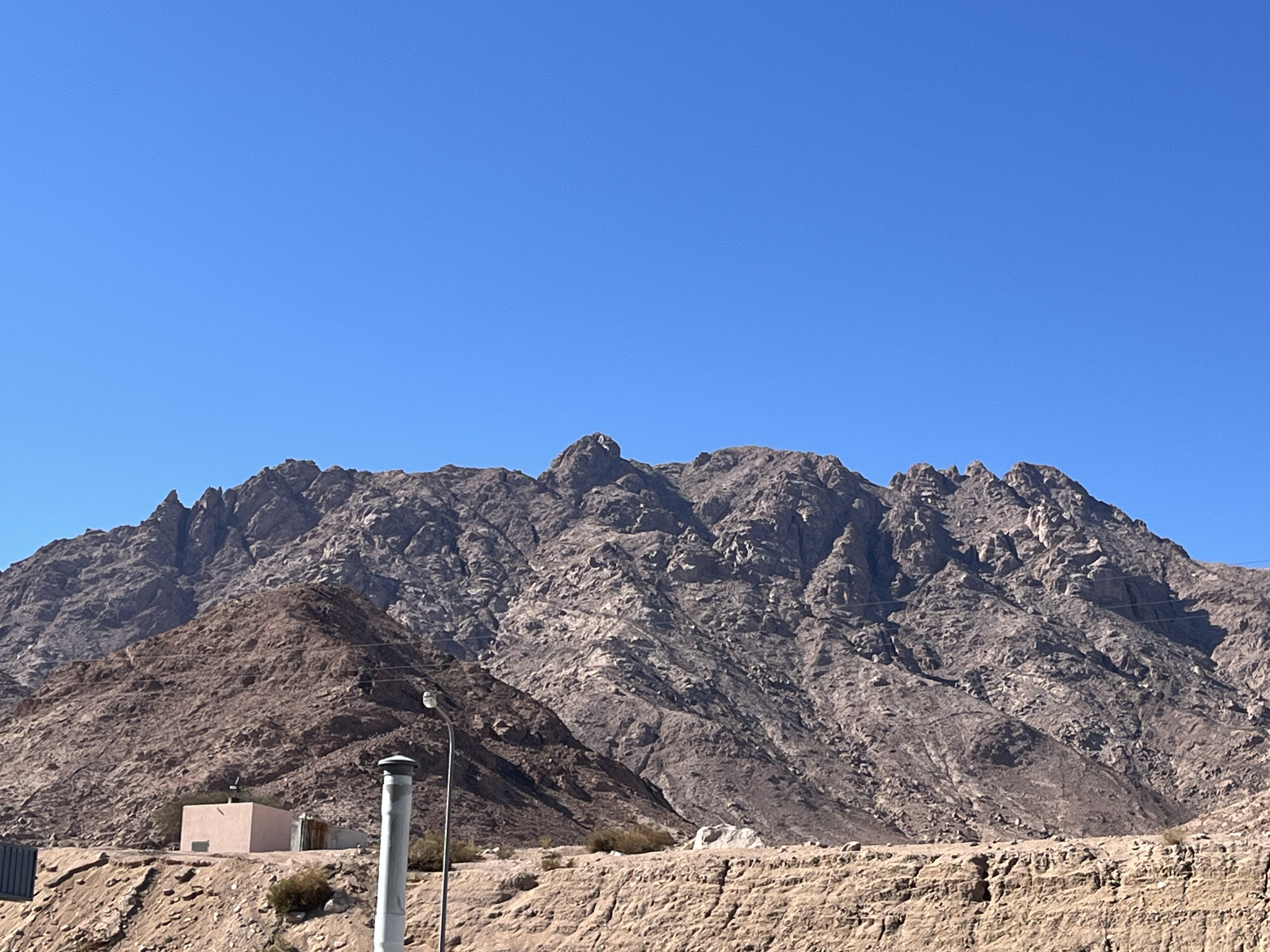

Highest point
- Elevation: 1,076 m (3,530 ft)
- Coordinates: 29°35′57″N 35°08′36″E

Geography
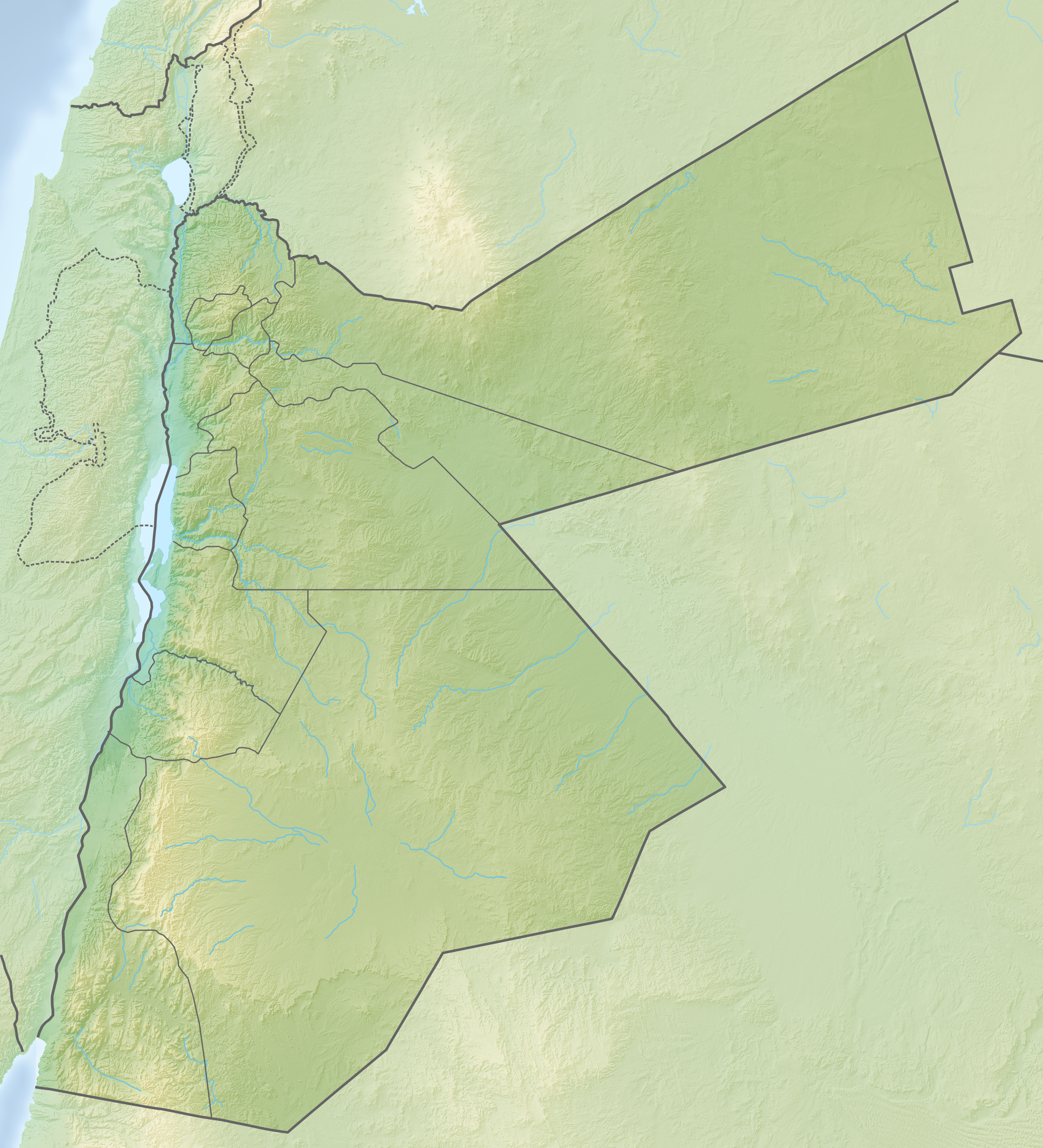
- Location within Jordan
- Location: Jordan

Jebel Baggir is a mountain north-east of the Gulf of Aqaba in Jordan. In his 1878 book Sinai in Arabia and of Median, Charles Beke proposes that it may be the Biblical Mount Sinai. Beke also states that nearby Jebel Ertowa is Mount Horeb. Both are near Wady Yutm.
