= Gabal Sin Bishar =

Mountain in Egypt

Coordinates: 29.671°N 32.961°E

Gabal Sin Bishar (also called Jebel Sin Bishar or Mount Sin Bishar) is a mountain located in west-central Sinai. It was proposed to be the biblical Mount Sinai by Menashe Har-El, a biblical geographer at Tel Aviv University in his book The Sinai Journeys: The Route of the Exodus. This location was used for Zondervan's NIV Atlas of the Bible.

== Gabal Sin Bishar & Suder Valley ==
Har-El believes the evidence supports Mount Sinai being located in the Suder Valley in the west-central Sinai Peninsula. His reasons include:

(a)	This region is far enough from potential Egyptian armies in the mining region of the south and the road in the north along the Mediterranean Sea – the Way of the Land of the Philistines – to survive without encountering Egyptian troops.
(b)	The Suder Valley is located in an area known to have been used by Semitic people who traveled to Egypt (1 Kings 11:17–18).
(c)	The meeting between Aaron and Moses (Exodus 4:27) likely took place on the road between Midian and Egypt, but closer to Egypt.
(d)	The Suder valley fits the wilderness described in the Bible.
(e)	"Gabal Sin Bishar" means "the reporting of the law" or "the laws of man", and this is the only mountain where, possibly, the name "Sinai" has been preserved in the name "sin".
(f)	Har-El cites Josephus' writings, who had access to the Jewish Temple's sacred books that he was given by Roman General Titus after the fall of Jerusalem in 70 AD. Josephus writes that the mountain was the highest mountain in its surroundings. The prominence of Gabal Sin Bishar is tooth-shaped and stands out from its surroundings, despite being 618 meters above sea level and only 300 meters above the landscape. This also means it is not so high that it would be difficult for 80 year-old Moses to go up and down four times (Exodus chapters 19–34) or too difficult for the Aaron and the 70 elders to go up with him.
(g)	There are graves and pottery from the middle Bronze Age.
(h)	There are circular piles of stones at the base of Gabal Sin Bishar (Exodus 24:4).
(i)	Notably, it addresses Pharaoh's request to not go far outside of Egypt (three days from the border as prescribed in Exodus 3:24).
(j)	There is a widespread presence of chalk and flint in Wadi Suder. (Exodus 4:24–26 records that Moses' son was circumcised on short notice using flint at the base of the mountain.)
(k)	The pastureland and water nearby could have supported the Israelite people for a year.
