= Mount Sinai =

Mountain in the Sinai Peninsula

- Arabic: جَبَل مُوْسَى, romanized: Gabal Mūsā (Note: Coptic: Ⲡⲧⲟⲟⲩ Ⲥⲓⲛⲁ, romanized: Ptoou Sina Classical Syriac: ܛܘܪܐ ܕܣܝܢܝ Ṭūrāʾ d-Sīnayy Ancient Greek: Ὄρος Σινά, romanized: Oros Sina Latin: Mons Sinai Hebrew: הַר סִינַי, romanized: Har Sinay)
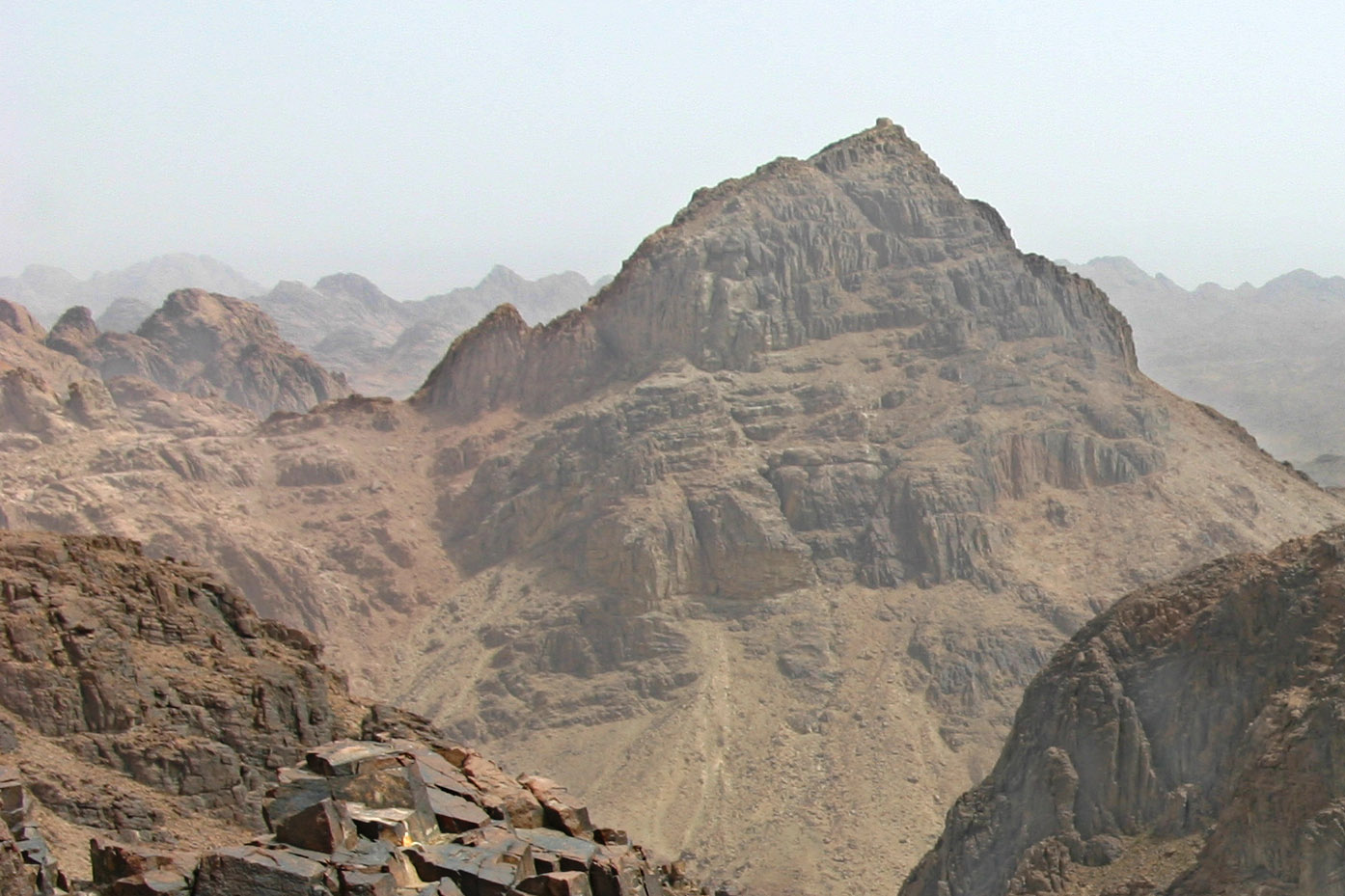
- Mount Sinai as seen from the southwest

Highest point
- Elevation: 2,285 m (7,497 ft)
- Prominence: 334 m (1,096 ft)
- Coordinates: 28°32′21.9″N 33°58′31.5″E

Naming
- Native name: طُوْر سِيْنَاء (Arabic); Ṭūr Sīnāʾ (Arabic)

Geography
- Location within Egypt
- Location: Sinai, Asian part of Egypt

Mount Sinai, (Note: Hebrew: הַר סִינַי Har Sinay; Aramaic: ܛܘܪܐ ܕܣܝܢܝ Ṭūrāʾ dəSīnăy; Coptic: Ⲡⲧⲟⲟⲩ Ⲥⲓⲛⲁ) also known as Jabal Musa (Arabic: جَبَل مُوسَى, lit. 'Mountain of Moses'), is a mountain on the Sinai Peninsula of Egypt. It is one of several locations claimed to be the biblical Mount Sinai, the place where, according to the sacred scriptures of the three major Abrahamic religions (Torah, Bible, and Quran), the Hebrew prophet Moses received the Ten Commandments from God.

It is a 2,285-meter (7,497 ft) mountain near the city of Saint Catherine in the region known today as the Sinai Peninsula. It is surrounded on all sides by higher peaks in the mountain range of which it is a part. For example, it lies adjacent to Mount Catherine which, at 2,629 m or 8,625 ft, is the highest peak in Egypt.

== Geology ==
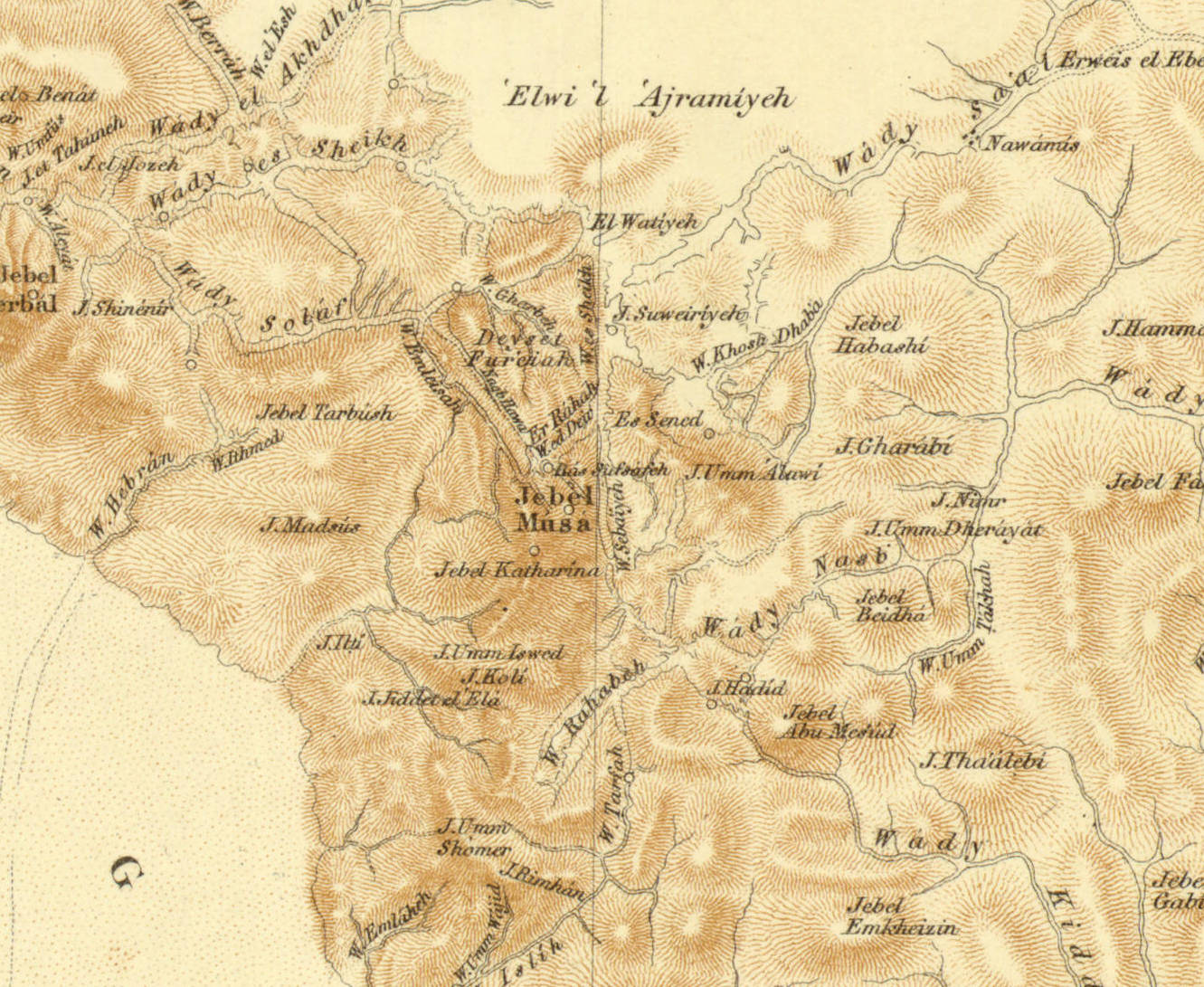
Jebel Musa in the 1869 Ordnance Survey of the Peninsula of Sinai, shown north of Mount Catherine (Jebel Katarina) and south of Willow Peak (Ras es-Safsafeh)

Mount Sinai's rocks were formed during the late stage of the evolution of the Arabian-Nubian Shield. Mount Sinai displays a ring complex that consists of alkaline granites intruded into diverse rock types, including volcanics. The granites range in composition from syenogranite to alkali feldspar granite. The volcanic rocks are alkaline to peralkaline, and they are represented by subaerial flows and eruptions and subvolcanic porphyry.

== Religious significance ==
=== Judaism ===
Mount Sinai has immense significance in Judaism as the place where the Ten Commandments on the Tablets of Stone, as well as the rest of the Torah, the Jewish scripture, was given by God to Moses and the Jewish people.

The festival of Shavuot in Judaism marks the importance of receiving the Torah at Mount Sinai. There is a special Torah portion for Shavuot in which the giving of the Torah and the Ten Commandments are read. Synagogues are also adorned with flowers and decorations to match the Jewish tradition in which Mount Sinai was adorned with flowers.

In Rabbinic Judaism, which is the primary form of Judaism nowadays and is practiced by Orthodox Jews, Moses received not just the Written Torah which is the Torah scroll but also the Oral Torah which encompasses the Mishnah and the Gemara which make up the Talmud.

However, in Judaism there are varying views and opinions for the exact location of Mount Sinai and the traditional site and area in the Sinai Peninsula may not be the mountain described in Jewish tradition where the Torah was given, see Mount Sinai (Bible).

=== Christianity ===
Immediately north of the mountain is the 6th-century Saint Catherine's Monastery. The summit has a Greek Orthodox chapel, constructed in 1934 on the ruins of a 16th-century church, that is not open to the public. The chapel encloses the rock which is considered to be the source for the biblical Tablets of Stone. At the summit also is "Moses' cave", where the Hebrew prophet Moses is believed to have waited to receive the Ten Commandments from God.

=== Islam ===
The mountain is associated with the Islamic prophet Mūsā ibn ʿImrān (i.e., Moses). In particular, numerous references to Jabal Musa exist in the Quran, where it is called Ṭūr Saināʾ, Ṭūr Sīnīn, and aṭ-Ṭūr and al-Jabal (both meaning "the Mount"). As for the adjacent Wād Ṭuwā (Valley of Tuwa), it is considered as being muqaddas (sacred), and a part of it is called Al-Buqʿah Al-Mubārakah ("The blessed Place").

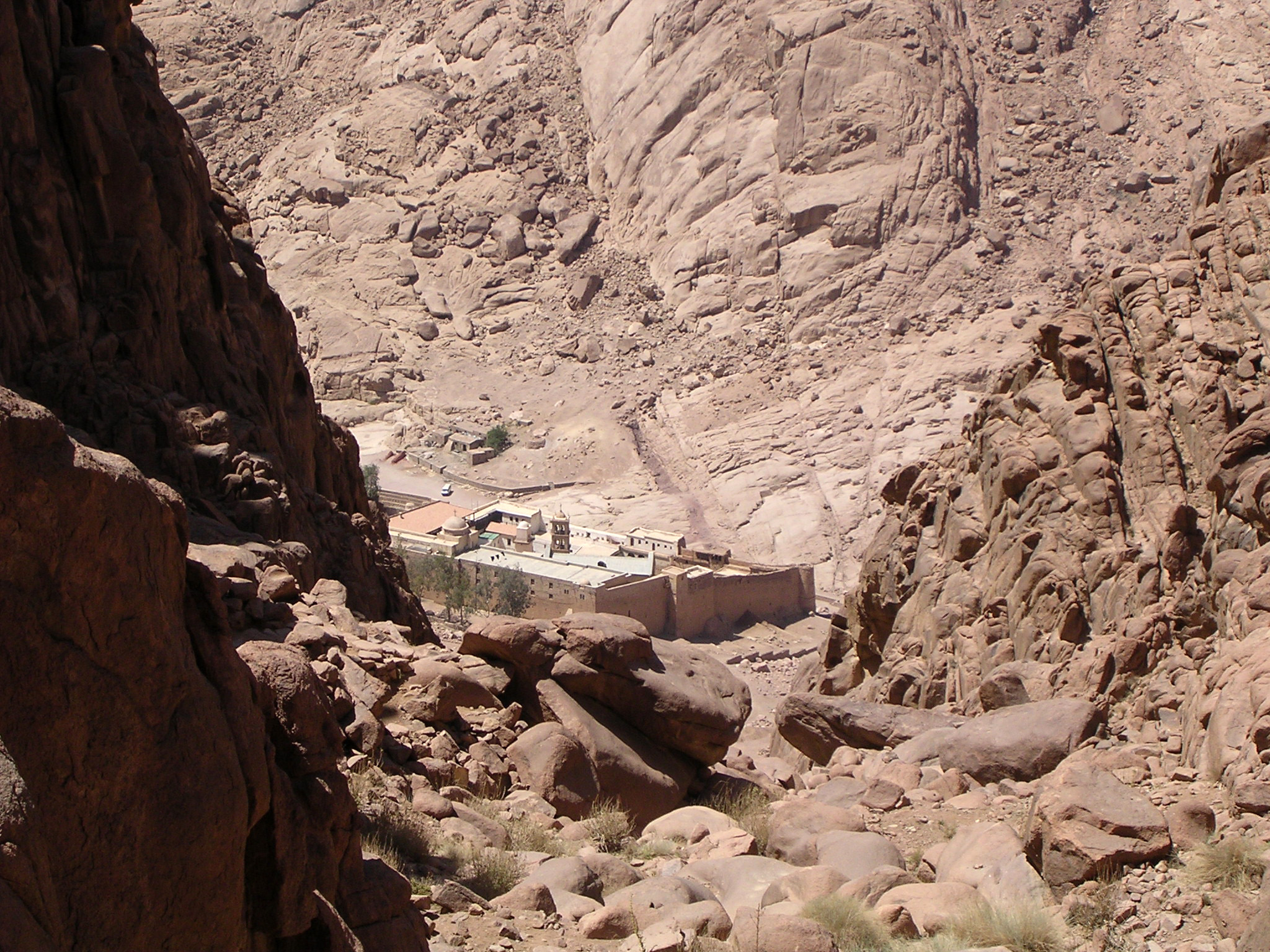
Saint Catherine's Monastery, looking down from Mount Sinai

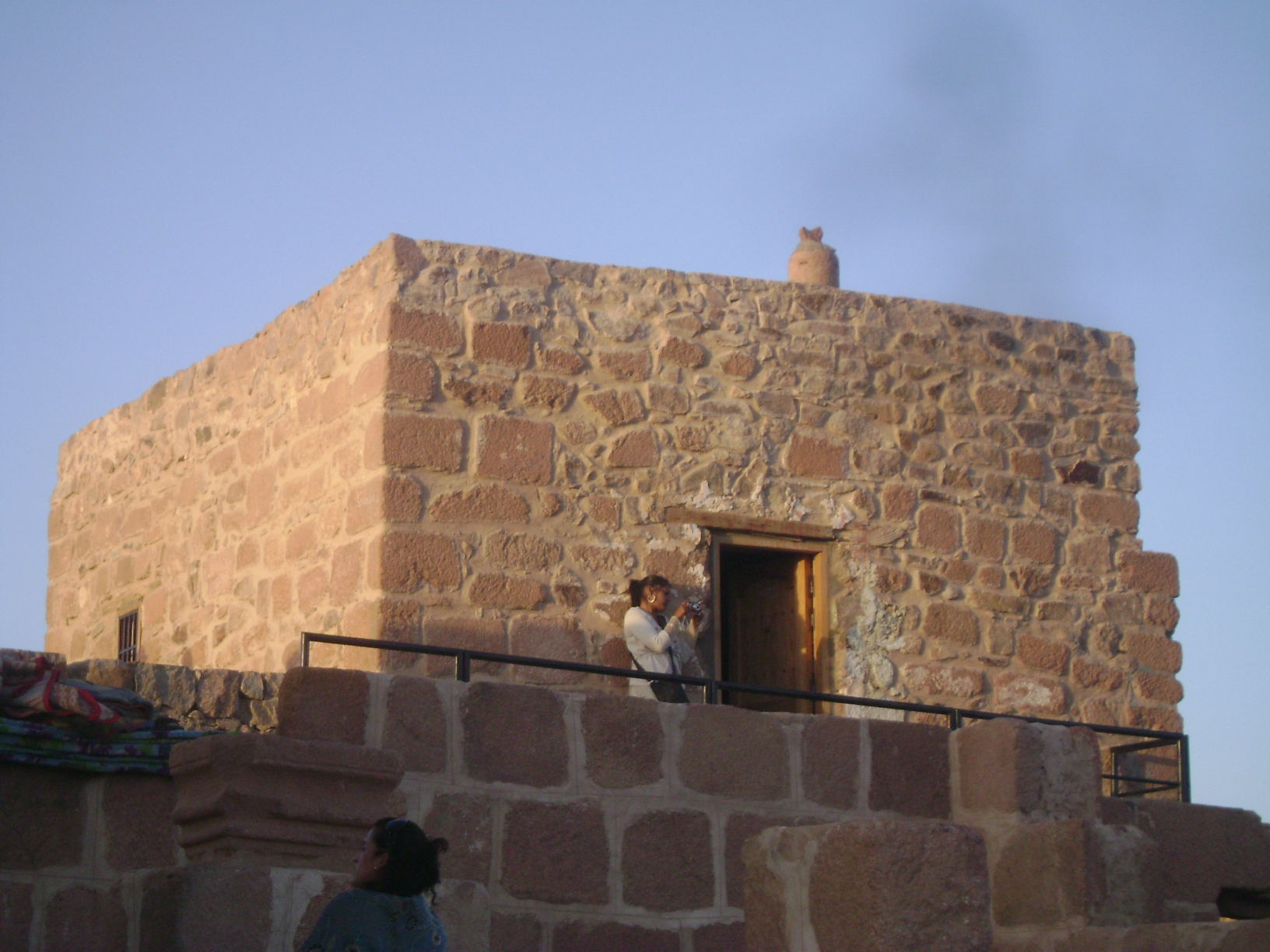
The mosque at the summit

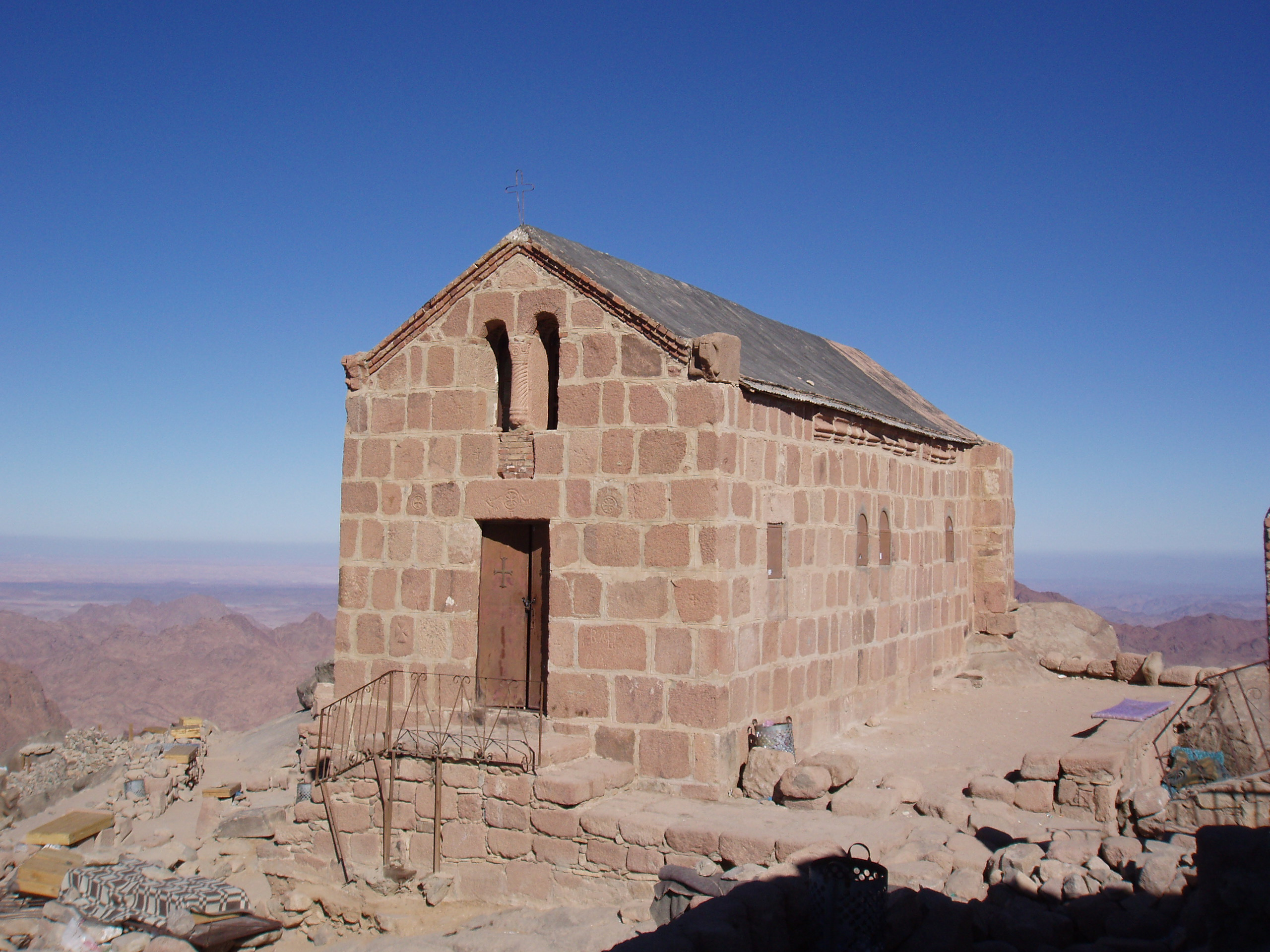
The chapel at the summit

== Ascent and summit ==
There are two principal routes to the summit. The longer and shallower route, Siket El Bashait, takes about 2.5 hours on foot, though camels can be used. The steeper, more direct route (Siket Sayidna Musa) is up the 3,750 "steps of penitence" in the ravine behind the monastery. It is mandatory to hike with a guide. A guide can be hired at the start of the trails before the monastery. Many tour companies offer tours ascending after midnight in the dark, in order to reach the summit for sunrise. Cafe stalls along the trail sell warm drinks and snacks. The mountain can also be hiked in the afternoon for sunset, when it is quieter. A small camp below the summit offers mattresses and blankets for rent, allowing visitors to sleep on the mountain overnight.

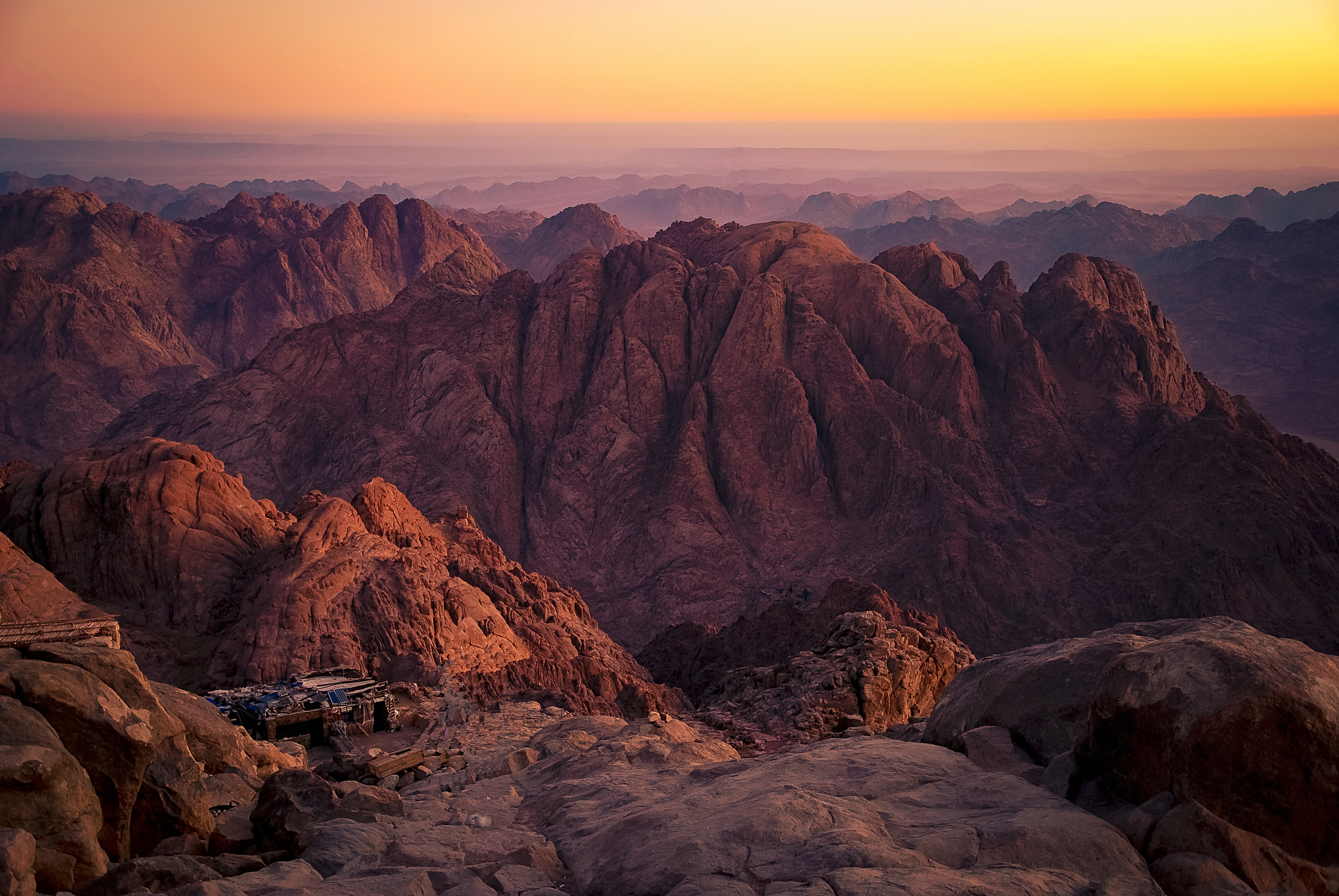
North-northeast view from the summit

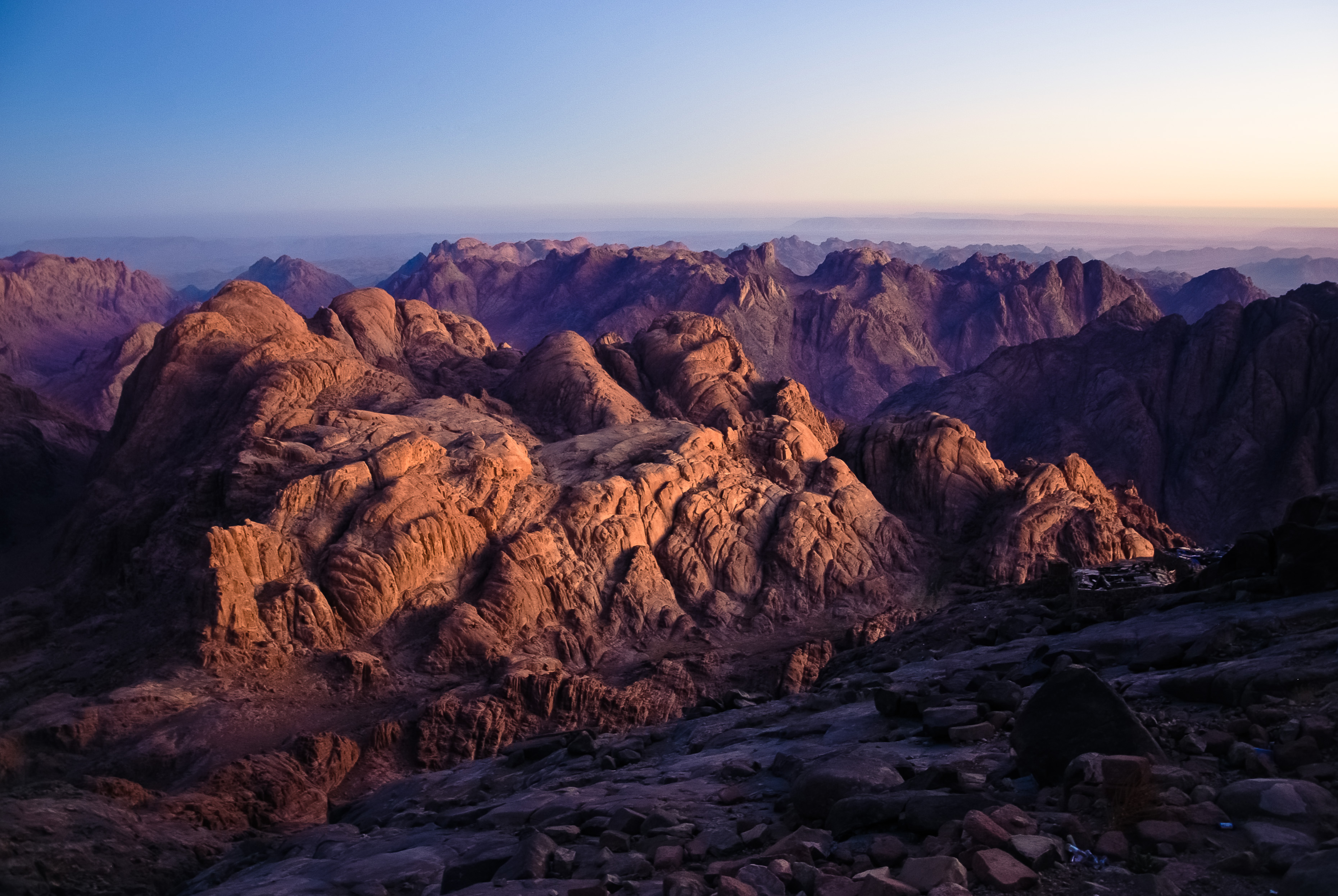
Northwest view from the summit

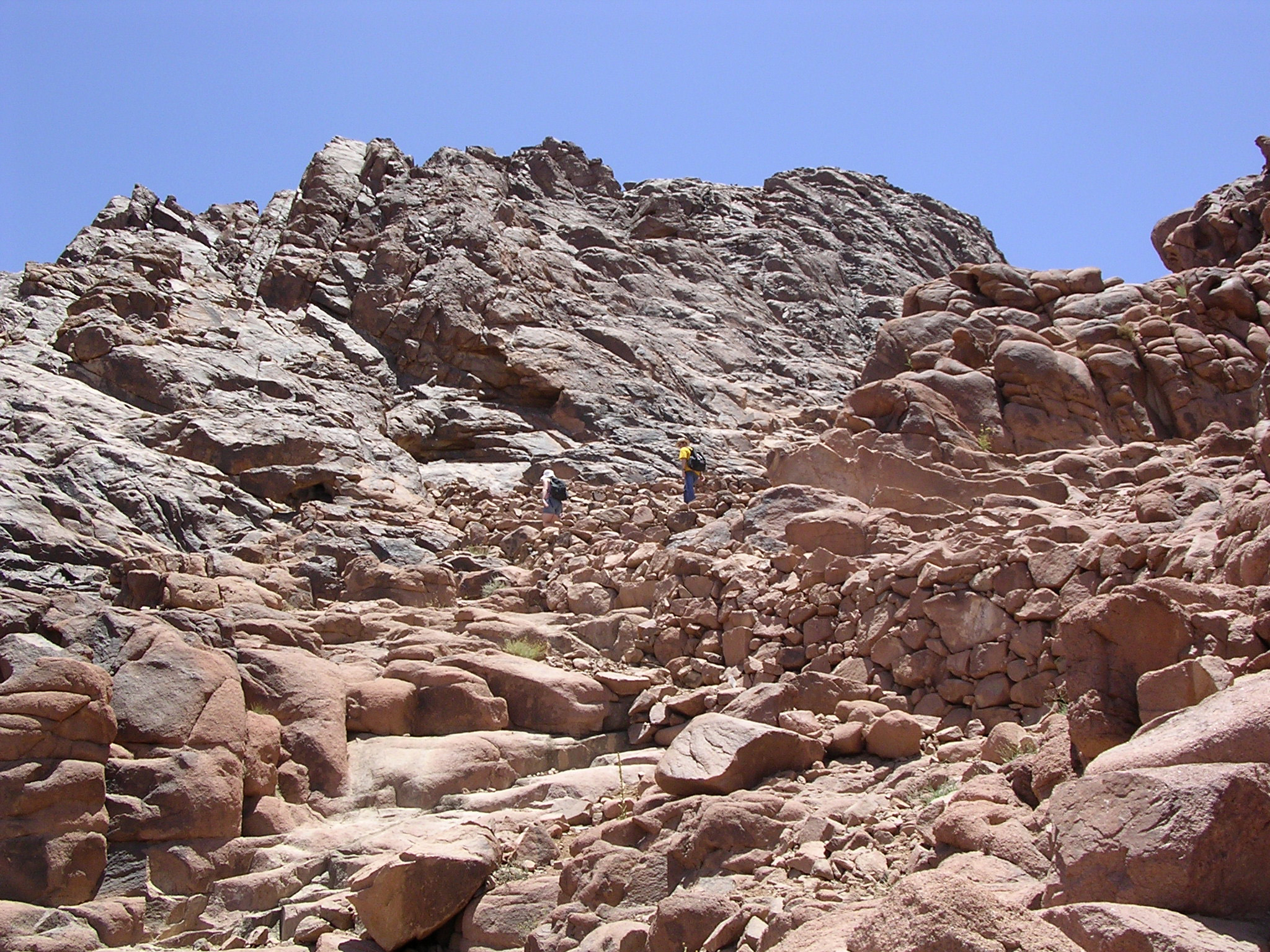
The last few meters of the climb up the mountain

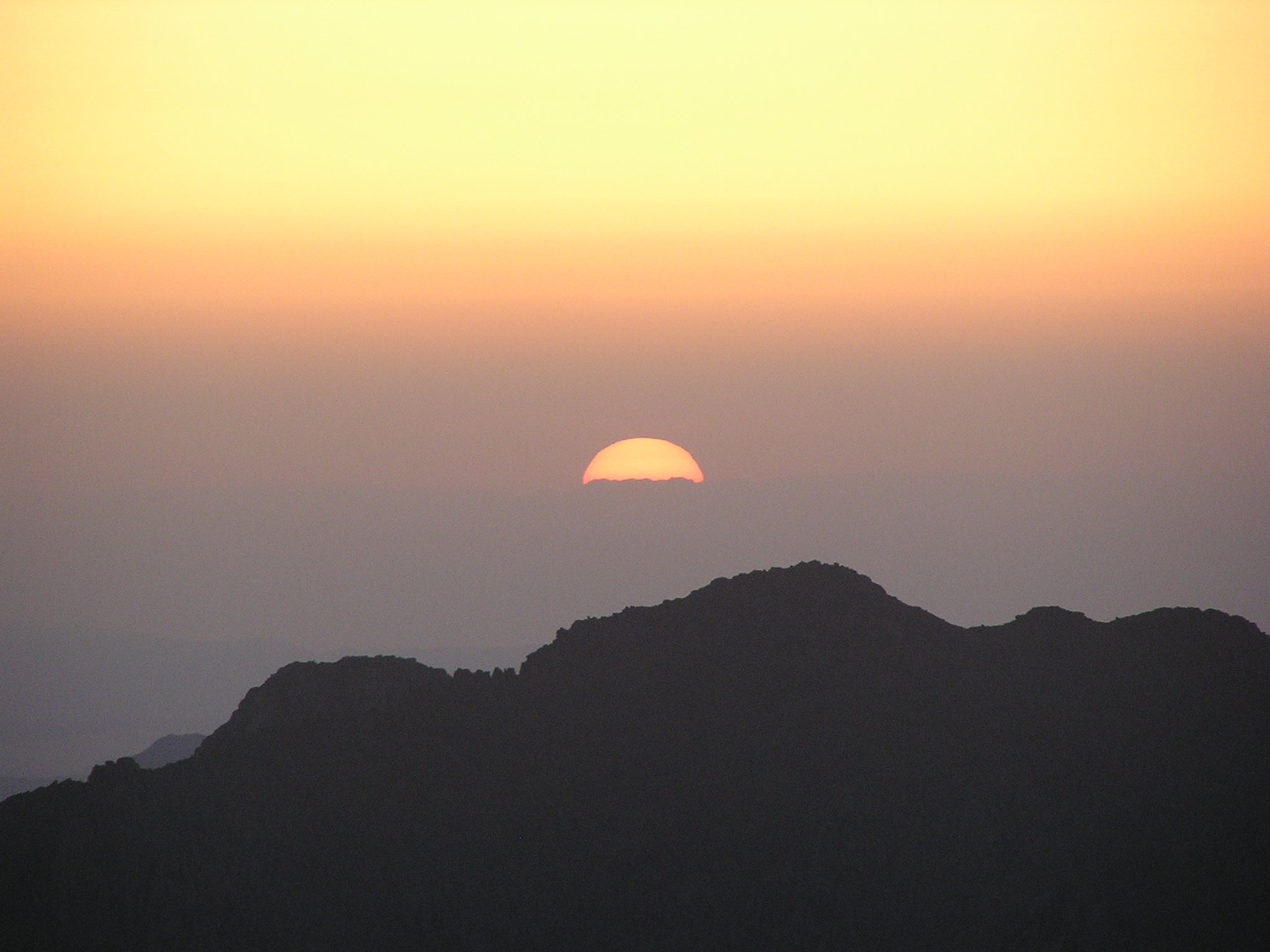
Sunrise
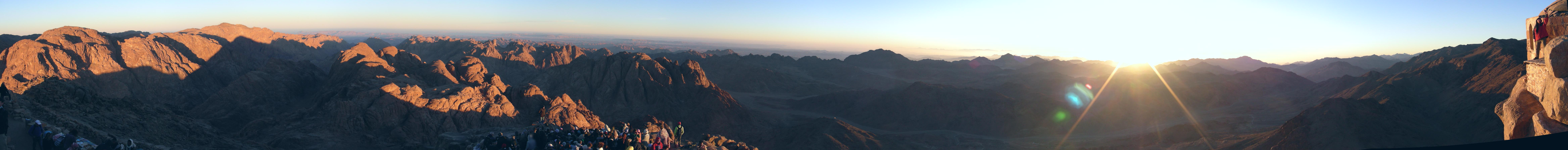
A panoramic view from the summit of Mount Sinai

== See also ==
- Shavuot
- Hashem El Tarif
- Sacred mountains
- Jebel Musa, Morocco, a similarly named mountain in Morocco
