= Jebel al-Madhbah =

Mountain in Jordan

Coordinates: 30.321944°N 35.4475°E

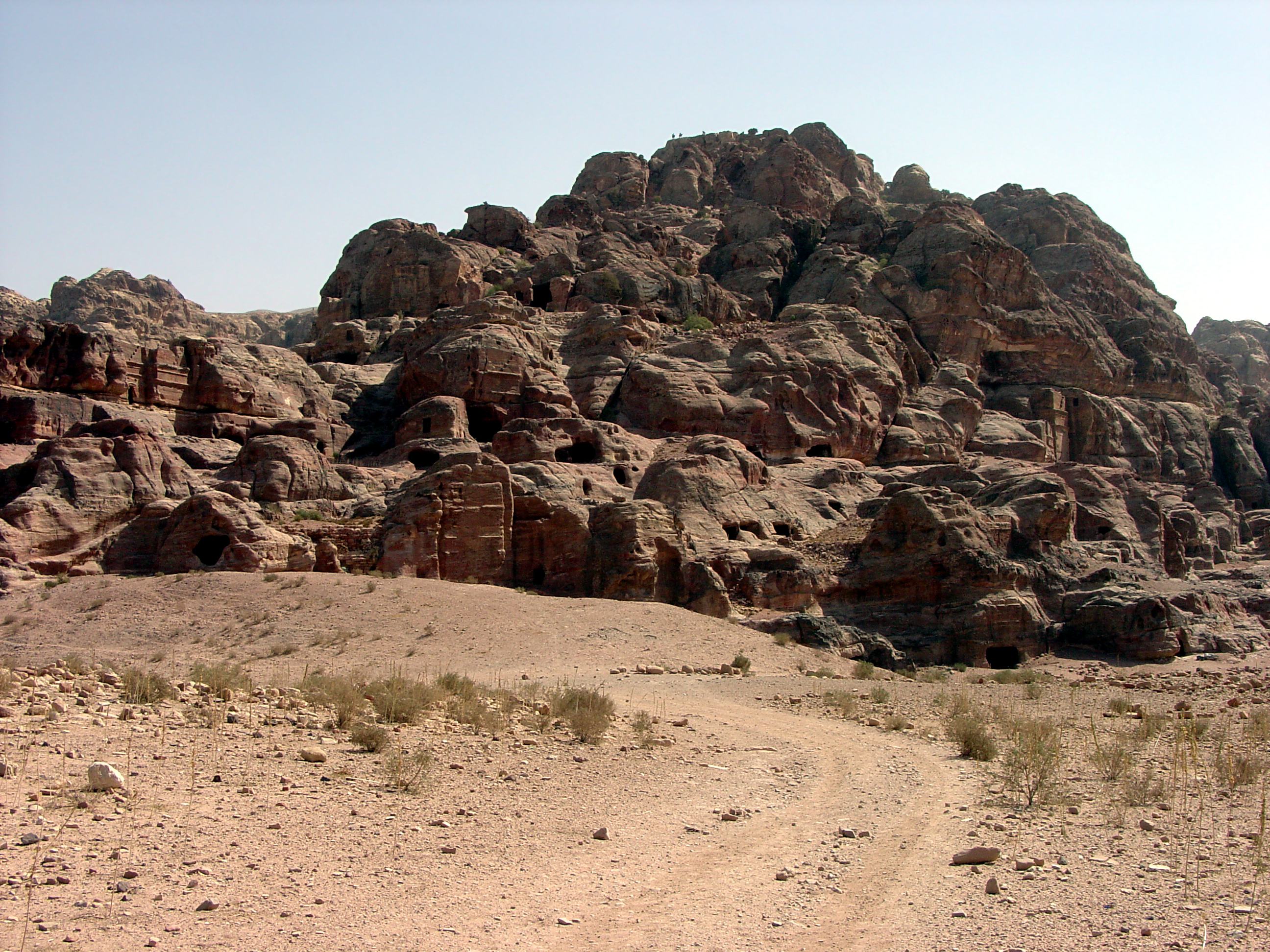
Jebel al-Madhbah

Jebel al-Madhbah (Arabic: جبل المذبح, Jabal al-Madhbaḥ, lit. "mountain of the altar") is a mountain at Petra, Jordan, at whose peak there is a large Nabataean ritual site centered around an altar.

== Description ==
The mountain is c. 1,070 m (3,510 ft) high. The name, which translates to "mountain of the altar", is well deserved since its summit is covered in rock-cut ceremonial structures reached by a rock-cut staircase. The French Middle East historian Maurice Sartre (b. 1944) noted that beneath the peak there are "two gigantic obelisks, carved out of the rocky mass, [which] appear as sacred stones", and the ritual complex at the very top "consists of a vast rectangular esplanade hollowed out in such a way that the sides formed benches; in the middle of one long side, a natural podium (motab) was set aside for placing the gods' sacred stones. Another section was reserved for the altar. Cisterns, fed by rainwater, were used for ablutions and cleaning."

== Mount Sinai theory ==
A number of scholars have proposed Jebel al-Madhbah as the Biblical Mount Sinai, beginning with Ditlef Nielsen in 1927.

The valley in which Petra resides is known as Wadi Musa, meaning Valley of Moses. At the entrance to Wadi Musa is Ain Musa, the Spring of Moses.

== See also ==
- Archaeology
