= Mount Sinai (Bible) =

Sacred mountain mentioned in the Bible

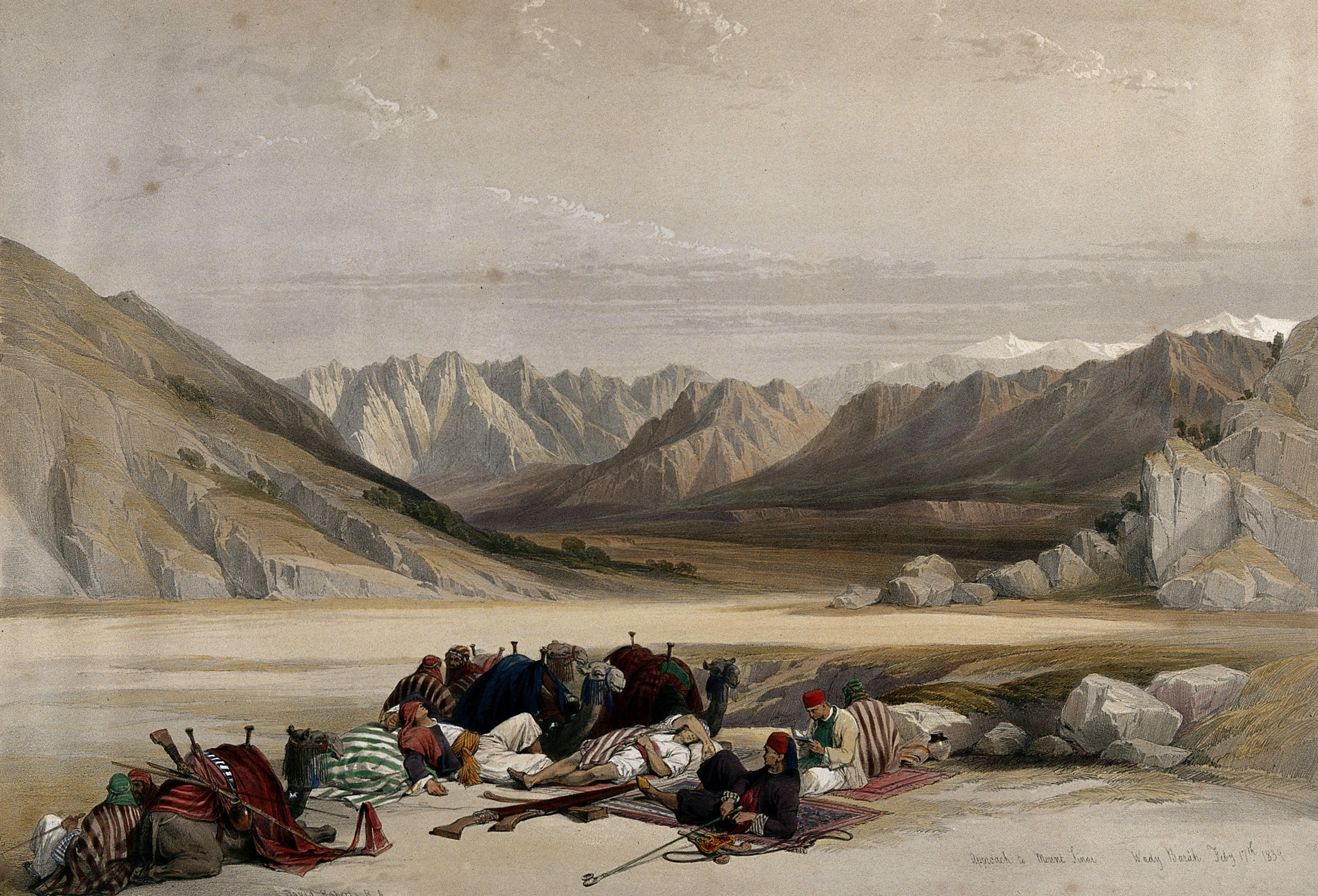
Camels and members of David Roberts' travelling party resting before the approach to Mount Sinai (1839). Painting featured as a coloured lithograph in The Holy Land, Syria, Idumea, Arabia, Egypt, and Nubia (Vol. 3), Wellcome Collection, London.

Possible locations of biblical Mount Sinai in the Southern Levant

Mount Sinai (Hebrew: הַר סִינַי, Har Sīnay) is the mountain at which the Ten Commandments were given to the Hebrew prophet Moses by God, according to the Book of Exodus in the Hebrew Bible/Old Testament. In the Book of Deuteronomy, these events are described as having transpired at Mount Horeb. "Sinai" and "Horeb" are generally considered by biblical scholars to refer to the same place. Mount Sinai is considered one of the most sacred locations by the three major Abrahamic religions: Judaism, Christianity, and Islam.

The exact geographical position of Mount Sinai described in the Hebrew Bible remains disputed; it has never been located. The high point of the dispute was in the mid-19th century. (Note: "The years between the 1830s and the 1870s, which mark the highpoint of the Sinai controversy, witnessed the rise of European countries into worldwide economic and political prominence ... The 1856 Treaty of Paris ensured better access for Europeans into Ottoman territory and casual visitors collected intelligence alongside antiquities ... The peninsula was strategically situated on the sea route from the Mediterranean to India through the Suez Canal which opened to traffic in 1869, a few months after the conclusion of the Ordnance Survey" Manginis (2015)) Biblical texts describe the theophany at Mount Sinai, in terms which a minority of scholars, following Charles Beke (1873), have suggested may literally describe the mountain as a volcano. (Note: "Now that Rameses is known to be located at Qantir in the Sharkiya province of the east Delta, this means that Beke's proposed site of ... Hermann Gunkel, Hugo Gressman, Martin Noth and Jean Koenig. They all thought that the biblical descriptions of the theophany at Mt. Sinai described volcanic activity, and since there was no evidence of volcanoes in Sinai, that northern Arabia was the more likely." Hoffmeier (2005))

== Biblical description ==
The biblical account of the giving of the instructions and teachings of the Ten Commandments was given in the Book of Exodus, primarily between chapters 19 and 24, during which Sinai is mentioned by name twice, in Exodus 19:2; 24:16. In the story Sinai was enveloped in a cloud, it quaked and was filled with smoke, while lightning-flashes shot forth, and the roar of thunder mingled with the blasts of a trumpet; the account later adds that fire was seen burning at the summit of the mountain. In the biblical account, the fire and clouds are a direct consequence of the arrival of God upon the mountain. According to the biblical story, Moses departed to the mountain and stayed there for 40 days and nights in order to receive the Ten Commandments, and he did so twice because he broke the first set of the Tablets of Stone after returning from the mountain for the first time.

The biblical description of God's descent seems to be in conflict with the statement shortly after that God spoke to the Israelites from Heaven. While biblical scholars argue that these passages are from different sources, the Mekhilta argues that God had lowered the heavens and spread them over Sinai, and the Pirke De-Rabbi Eliezer argues that a hole was torn in the heavens, and Sinai was torn away from the earth and the summit pushed through the hole. "The heavens" could be a metaphor for clouds and the "lake of fire" could be a metaphor for the lava-filled crater. Several bible critics have indicated that the smoke and fire reference from the Bible suggests that Mount Sinai was a volcano; despite the absence of ash. Other bible scholars have suggested that the description fits a storm especially as the Song of Deborah seems to allude to rain having occurred at the time. According to the biblical account, God spoke directly to the Israelite nation as a whole.

Sinai is mentioned by name in ten other locations in the Torah: Exodus 31:18; 34:2, Leviticus 7:38; 25:1; 26:46; 27:34, Numbers 1:1; 3:1; 9:1 and Deuteronomy 33:2. Sinai was also mentioned once by name in the rest of the Hebrew Bible in Nehemiah 9:13. In the New Testament, Paul the Apostle referred directly to Sinai in Galatians 4:24; 4:25.

== Etymology and other names ==
The oldest reference to Sinai is found on a stele of the 11th Dynasty Egyptian official Khety, who mentions an area called Ṯnht, probably an early transliteration of Sinai.

Scholars suggested that Biblical Hebrew: חֹרֵב Ḥōrēḇ meant "glowing/heat," which seems to be a reference to the sun, while סיני Sinay may have derived from the name of Sin, the Mesopotamian deity of the moon, and thus Sinai and Horeb would be the mountains of the moon and sun, respectively. However, William F. Albright, an American biblical scholar, has argued:

... there is nothing that requires us to explain Him as a modified moon-god. It is improbable that the name Sinai is derived from that of the Sumerian Zen (older Zu-en), Akkadian Sin, the moon-god worshiped at Ur (in his form Nannar) and at Harran, since there is no indication that the name Sin was ever employed by the Canaanites or the Semitic nomads of Palestine. It is much more likely that the name Sinai is connected with the place-name Sin, which belongs to a desert plain in Sinai as well as to a Canaanite city in Syria and perhaps to a city in the northeast Delta of Egypt. It has also been recognized that it may somehow be connected with seneh (Aram. sanya), the name of a kind of bush where Moses is said to have first witnessed the theophany of Yahweh.

According to the documentary hypothesis, the name "Sinai" is only used in the Torah by the Jahwist and the Priestly source, whereas Horeb is only used by the Elohist and Deuteronomist. The incongruity between the two names would be resolved, however, if Sinai and Horeb refer to two peaks of the same mountain formation.

In his book Sinai and Zion, American Hebrew Bible scholar Jon D. Levenson discusses the link between Sinai and the burning bush (Biblical Hebrew: סנה, romanized: səne) that Moses encountered at Mount Horeb in verses 3:1–6 of Exodus. He asserts that the similarity of Sinay and səne is not coincidental; the wordplay might derive "from the notion that the emblem of the Sinai deity was a tree of some sort." Deuteronomy 33:16 identifies YHWH with "the one who dwells in the bush." Consequently, Levenson argues that if the use of "bush" is not a scribal error for "Sinai," Deuteronomy might support the connection between the origins of the word Sinai and tree.

Classical rabbinic literature mentions the mountain having other names:

- Har HaElohim (הר האלהים), meaning "the mountain of God" or "the mountain of the gods"
- Har Horeb (הר חורב), see Mount Horeb.

Also mentioned in most Islamic sources:

- ṭūr Sīnāʾ and ṭūr Sīnīn (طور سيناء / سينين) are terms that appear in the Quran; they mean "the mount of Sinay".
- Jabal Mūsa (جبل موسى), is another term that means "Mountain of Moses"

== Religious traditions ==
=== Christianity ===
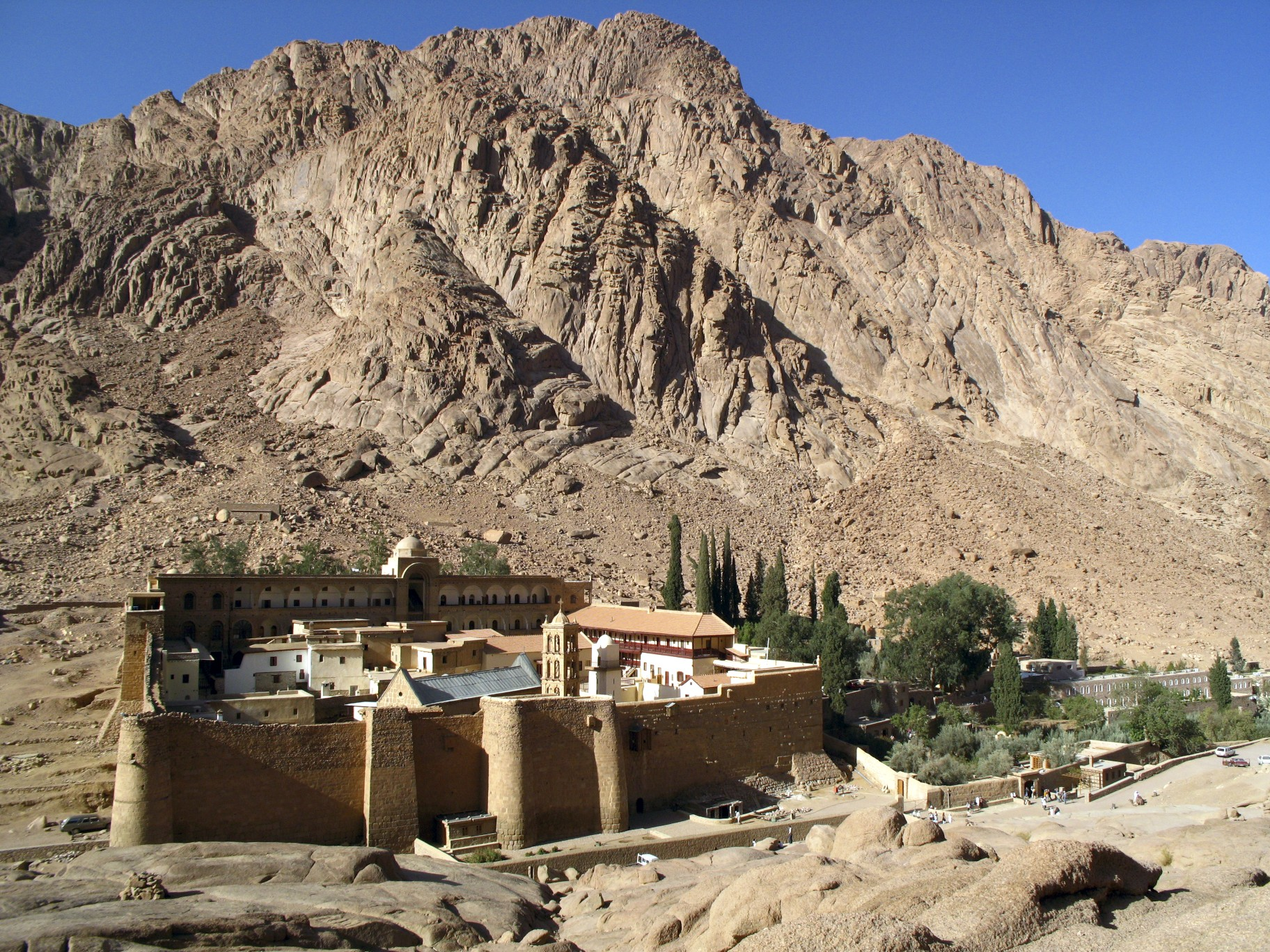
Saint Catherine's Monastery in Egypt with Ras Sufsafeh, traditionally considered either Mount Sinai or Horeb, in the background.

The earliest references to Mount Sinai in Egypt, or Mount Sinai being located in the present-day Sinai Peninsula, are inconclusive. There is evidence that before 100 CE, well before the Christian monastic period, Jewish sages equated Jabal Musa with Mount Sinai. Graham Davies of the University of Cambridge argues that early Jewish pilgrimages identified Jabal Musa as Mount Sinai so Christian pilgrims adopted this identification. R.K. Harrison states that "Jebel Musa ... seems to have enjoyed special sanctity long before Christian times, culminating in its identification with Mt. Sinai." In the 2nd and 3rd centuries BCE, Nabataeans were making pilgrimages there, which is indicated in part by inscriptions discovered in the area. In the 6th century CE, Saint Catherine's Monastery was constructed at the base of this mountain at a site which is believed to be the location of the biblical burning bush.

Saint Catherine's Monastery lies on the Sinai Peninsula, at the mouth of an inaccessible gorge at the foot of Mount Sinai at 1,550 metres (5,090 ft). The monastery is an autonomous Eastern Orthodox church called the Church of Sinai and is a UNESCO World Heritage Site. According to the UNESCO report (60 100 ha / Ref: 954), Saint Catherine's Monastery is considered to be the oldest working Christian monastery in the world, although the Monastery of Saint Anthony, situated across the Red Sea in the desert south of Cairo, also lays claim to that title.

Christian monks settled upon this mountain in the 3rd century CE. Georgians from the Caucasus moved to the Sinai Peninsula in the 5th century CE, and a Georgian colony was formed there in the 9th century CE. Georgians erected Orthodox churches in the area of Mount Sinai. The construction of one such church was connected with the name of King David IV (d. January 1125), who contributed to the erection of Orthodox churches in the Kingdom of Georgia as well as abroad. There were political, cultural, and religious motives for locating the church on Mount Sinai.

=== Islam ===
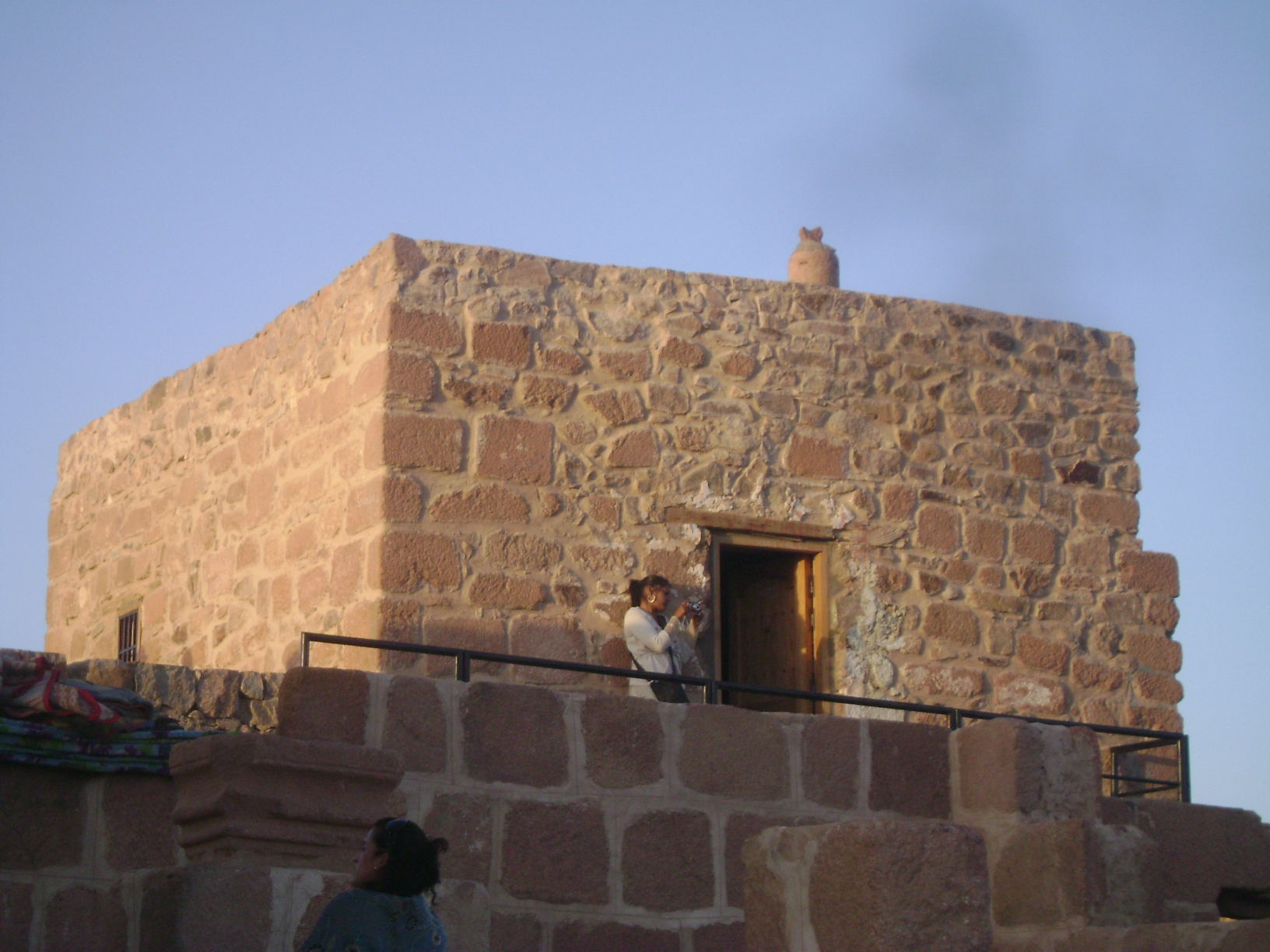
A mosque built at the top of Jabal Musa, in the Sinai Peninsula.

The Sinai Peninsula is associated with Aaron and Moses, who are also regarded as prophets in Islam. In particular, Mount Sinai is mentioned several times in the Quran, where it is called Ṭūr Sīnā’, Ṭūr Sīnīn, and aṭ-Ṭūr and al-Jabal (both meaning "the Mount"). As for the adjacent Wādī Ṭuwā, it is considered muqaddas "sacred", and a part of it is called al-Buqʿa al-Mubāraka (Arabic: ٱلْبُقْعَة ٱلْمُبَارَكَة, "The Blessed Place").

=== Other ===
Some modern biblical scholars explain Mount Sinai as having been a sacred place dedicated to one of the Canaanite deities even before the Israelites encountered it. Others regard the set of divine laws given to Moses on the mountain to have originated in different periods from one another, with the later ones mainly being the result of natural evolution over the centuries of the earlier ones, rather than all originating from a single moment in time.

== Suggested locations ==
Modern scholars differ as to the exact geographical position of biblical Mount Sinai. The Elijah narrative appears to suggest that when it was written, the location of Horeb was still known with some certainty, as Elijah is described as travelling there on one occasion, but there are no later biblical references to it that suggest the location remained known; Roman–Jewish historian Flavius Josephus specifies that it was "between Egypt and Arabia", and within Arabia Petraea, a Roman province encompassing modern Jordan, southern Syria, the Sinai Peninsula, and northwestern Arabia, with its capital in Petra. The Pauline Epistles are even more vague, specifying only that it was in northern Arabia, which at the time referred to Arabia Petraea. The Sinai Peninsula has traditionally been considered the location of biblical Mount Sinai by Christians, although the peninsula gained its name from this tradition, and was not called that in Josephus' time or earlier.

Location				Original identification	
Name	Region	Height (m)	Coordinates	Year	Author
Jabal Maqla	Tabuk Region, Saudi Arabia	2,326	28.59674°N 35.33549°E		
Jabal al-Lawz	Tabuk Region, Saudi Arabia	2,580	28.654167°N 35.305833°E	1984	Ron Wyatt
Hala-'l Badr (volcano)	Al Madinah Region, Saudi Arabia	1,692	27.25°N 37.2°E	1911	Alois Musil
Mount Serbal	South Sinai, Egypt	2,070	28.646389°N 33.651667°E		
Mount Catherine	South Sinai, Egypt	2,629	28.511667°N 33.9525°E		
Mount Sinai (Jabal Musa)	South Sinai, Egypt	2,285	28.539417°N 33.975417°E		
Jabal Ahmad al Baqir	Aqaba Governorate, Jordan	1,076	29.59911°N 35.14342°E	1878	Charles Beke
Jebel al-Madhbah	Petra, Jordan	1,070	30.321944°N 35.4475°E	1927	Ditlef Nielsen
Mount Sin Bishar	North Sinai, Egypt		29.671°N 32.961°E	1983	Menashe Har-El
Mount Helal	North Sinai, Egypt	910	30.653°N 34.028861°E		
Hashem el-Tarif	North Sinai, Egypt	881	29.669217°N 34.633411°E		
Mount Hermon	Anti-Lebanon, Lebanon	2,814	33.4162°N 35.8570°E	2010	Israel Knohl

=== Jabal Musa ===
Roman–Jewish historian Flavius Josephus wrote that "Moses went up to a mountain that lay between Egypt and Arabia, which was called Sinai." Josephus says that Sinai is "the highest of all the mountains thereabout", and is "the highest of all the mountains that are in that country, and is not only very difficult to be ascended by men, on account of its vast altitude but because of the sharpness of its precipices". The traditional Mount Sinai, located in the Sinai Peninsula, is actually the name of a collection of peaks, sometimes referred to as the Holy Mountain peaks, which consist of Jabal Musa, Mount Catherine, and Ras Sufsafeh. In the 4th century, a Christian pilgrim woman named Etheria wrote that "the whole mountain group looks as if it were a single peak, but, as you enter the group, [you see that] there are more than one." The highest mountain peak is Mount Catherine, rising 2,610 metres (8,550 feet) above the sea and its sister peak, Jabal Musa (2,285 m [7,497 ft]), is not much further behind in height, but is more conspicuous because of the open plain called er Rachah ("the wide"). Mount Catherine and Jabal Musa are both much higher than any mountains in the Sinaitic desert, or in all of Midian. The highest tops in the Tih desert to the north are not much over 1,200 m (4,000 ft). Those in Midian, East of Elath, rise only to 1,300 m (4,200 ft). Even Jabal Serbal, 30 kilometres (20 mi) west of Sinai, is at its highest only 2,050 m (6,730 ft) above the sea.

Some scholars believe that Mount Sinai was of ancient sanctity prior to the ascent of Moses described in the Bible. Scholars have theorized that Sinai in part derived its name from the word for Moon which was "sin" (meaning "the moon" or "to shine"). Antoninus Martyr provides some support for the ancient sanctity of Jabal Musa by writing that Arabian heathens were still celebrating moon feasts there in the 6th century. Lina Eckenstien states that some of the artifacts discovered indicate that "the establishment of the moon-cult in the peninsula dates back to the pre-dynastic days of Egypt." She says the main center of Moon worship seems to have been concentrated in the southern Sinai peninsula which the Egyptians seized from the Semitic people who had built shrines and mining camps there. Robinson says that inscriptions with pictures of Moon worship objects are found all over the southern peninsula but are missing on Jabal Musa and Mount Catherine. This oddity may suggest religious cleansing.

Groups of nawamis have been discovered in southern Sinai, creating a kind of ring around Jabal Musa. The nawamis were used over and over throughout the centuries for various purposes. Etheria, c. the 4th/5th century CE, noted that her guides, who were the local "holy men", pointed out these round or circular stone foundations of temporary huts, claiming the children of Israel used them during their stay there.

The southern Sinai Peninsula contains archaeological discoveries but to place them with the exodus from Egypt is a daunting task inasmuch as the proposed dates of the Exodus vary widely. The Exodus has been dated from the early Bronze Age to the late Iron Age II.

Egyptian pottery in the southern Sinai during the late Bronze Age and early Iron Age I (Ramesside) periods has been discovered at the mining camps of Serabit el-Khadim and Timna. Objects which bore Proto-Sinaitic inscriptions, the same as those found in Canaan, were discovered at Serabit el Khadim in the Southern Sinai. Several of these were dated in the later Bronze Age. These encampments provide evidence of miners from southern Canaan. The remote site of Serabit el-Khadem was used for a few months at a time, every couple of years at best, more often once in a generation. The journey to the mines was long, difficult and dangerous. Expeditions headed by Professor Mazar examined the tell of Feiran, the principal oasis, of southern Sinai and discovered the site abounded not only in Nabatean sherds but in wheel-burnished sherds typical of the Kingdom of Judah, belonging to Iron Age II.

Edward Robinson insisted that the Plain of ar-Raaha adjacent to Jabal Musa could have accommodated the Israelites. Edward Hull stated that, "this traditional Sinai in every way meets the requirements of the narrative of the Exodus." Hull agreed with Robinson and stated he had no further doubts after studying the great amphitheater leading to the base of the granite cliff of Ras Sufsafeh, that here indeed was the location of the camp and the mount from which the laws of God was delivered to the encampment of Israelites below.

F. W. Holland stated "With regard to water-supply there is no other spot in the whole Peninsula which is nearly so well supplied as the neighborhood of Jabal Musa. ... There is also no other district in the Peninsula which affords such excellent pasturage." Calculating the travels of the Israelites, the Bible Atlas states, "These distances will not, however, allow of our placing Sinai farther East than Jabal Musa."

Some point to the absence of material evidence left behind in the journey of the Israelites but Dr. Beit-Arieh wrote, "Perhaps it will be argued, by those who subscribe to the traditional account in the Bible, that the Israelite material culture was only of the flimsiest kind and left no trace. Presumably the Israelite dwellings and artifacts consisted only of perishable materials." Hoffmeier wrote, "None of the encampments of the wilderness wanderings can be meaningful if the Israelites went directly to either Kadesh or Midian ... a journey of eleven days from Kadesh to Horeb can be properly understood only in relationship to the southern portion of the Sinai Peninsula."

Local Bedouins who have long inhabited the area have identified Jabal Musa as Mount Sinai. In the 4th century CE small settlements of monks set up places of worship around Jabal Musa. An Egyptian pilgrim named Ammonius, who had in past times made various visits to the area, identified Jabal Musa as the Holy Mount in the 4th century. Empress Helena, c. 330 CE, built a church to protect monks against raids from nomads. She chose the site for the church from the identification which had been handed down through generations through the Bedouins. She also reported the site was confirmed to her in a dream.

Egyptologist Julien Cooper has suggested that the name Sinai corresponds with a toponym Ṯnht, attested in the itinerary of an Egyptian official of the 11th Dynasty (c. 2150–1990 BCE). He notes that this toponymn was located in the southern parts of the Sinai Peninsula, corresponding with the geographical location of Jabal Musa.

Bedouin tradition considered Jabal Musa, which lies adjacent to Mount Catherine, to be the biblical mountain, and it is this mountain that local tour groups and religious groups presently advertise as the biblical Mount Sinai. Evidently this view was eventually taken up by Christian groups as well, as in the 16th century a church was constructed at the peak of this mountain, which was replaced by a Greek Orthodox chapel in 1954.

=== Mount Serbal, Southern Sinai Peninsula ===
In early Christian times, a number of Anchorites settled on Mount Serbal, considering it to be the biblical mountain, and in the 4th century a monastery was constructed at its base. Nevertheless, Josephus had stated that Mount Sinai was "the highest of all the mountains thereabout", which would imply that Mount Catherine was actually the mountain in question, if Sinai was to be sited on the Sinai peninsula at all.

=== Northern Sinai Peninsula ===
According to textual scholars, in the JE version of the Exodus narrative, the Israelites travel in a roughly straight line to Kadesh Barnea from the Yam Suph (literally meaning "the Reed Sea", but considered traditionally to refer to the Red Sea), and the detour via the south of the Sinai peninsula is only present in the Priestly Source. A number of scholars and commentators have therefore looked towards the more central and northern parts of the Sinai peninsula for the mountain. Mount Sin Bishar, in the west-central part of the peninsula, was proposed to be the biblical Mount Sinai by Menashe Har-El, a biblical geographer at Tel Aviv University. Mount Helal, in the north of the peninsula has also been proposed. Another northern Sinai suggestion is Hashem el-Tarif, some 30 km west of Eilat, Israel.

=== Edom/Nabatea ===
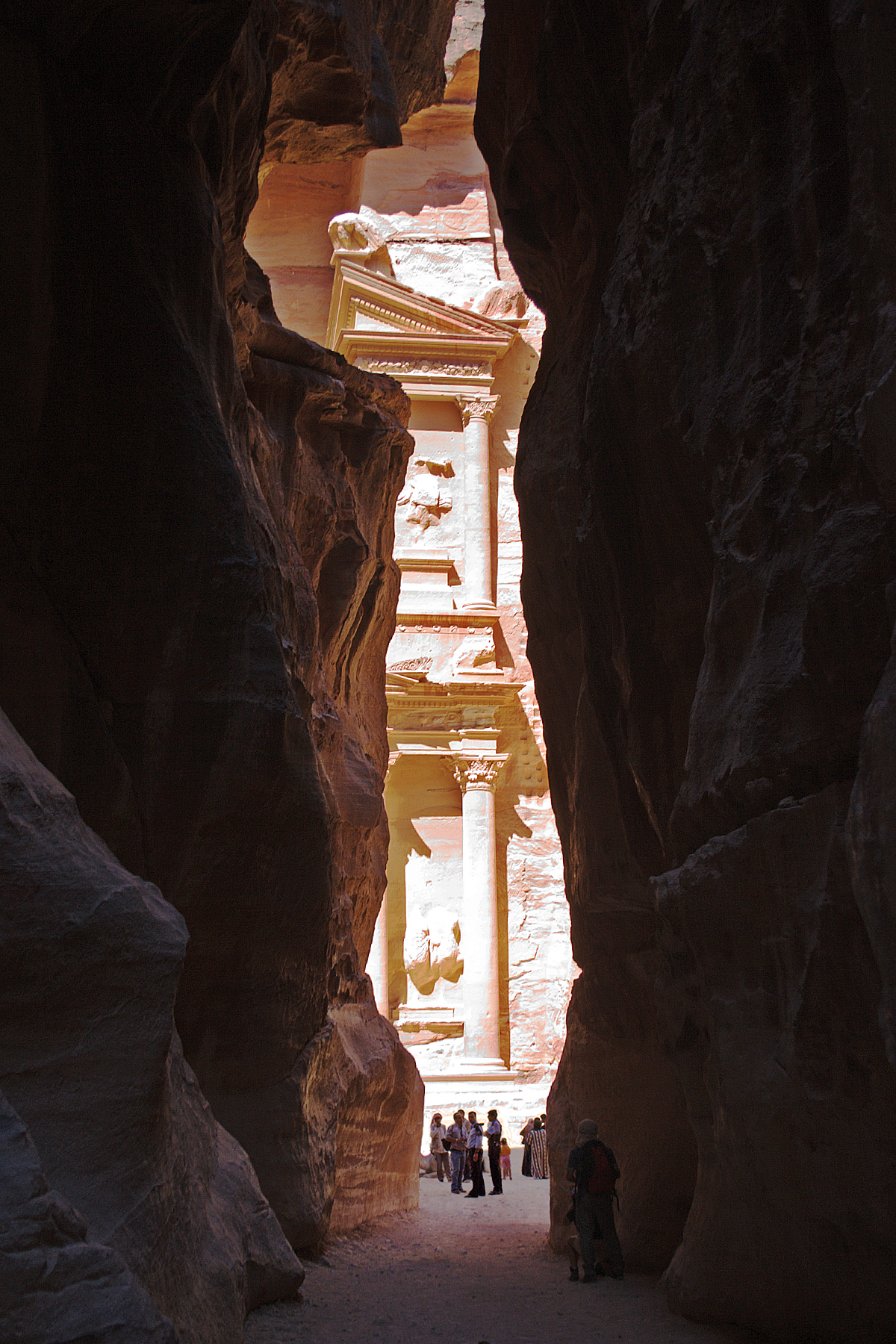
The Siq, facing Petra's Treasury, at the foot of Jebel al-Madhbah

Since Moses is described by the Bible as encountering Jethro, a Kenite who was a Midianite priest, shortly before encountering Sinai, this suggests that Sinai would be somewhere near their territory in Saudi Arabia; the Kenites and Midianites appear to have resided east of the Gulf of Aqaba. Additionally, the Song of Deborah, which some textual scholars consider one of the oldest parts of the Bible, portrays God as having dwelt at Mount Seir, and seems to suggest that this equates with Mount Sinai; Mount Seir designates the mountain range in the centre of Edom.

Based on a number of local names and features, in 1927 Ditlef Nielsen identified the Jebel al-Madhbah (meaning mountain of the Altar) at Petra as being identical to the biblical Mount Sinai; since then other scholars have also made the identification.

The valley in which Petra resides is known as the Wadi Musa, meaning valley of Moses, and at the entrance to the Siq is the Ain Musa, meaning spring of Moses; the 13th century Arab chronicler Numari stated that Ain Musa was the location where Moses had brought water from the ground, by striking it with his rod. The Jebel al-Madhbah was evidently considered particularly sacred, as the well known ritual building known as The Treasury is carved into its base, the mountain top is covered with a number of different altars, and over 8 metres of the original peak were carved away to leave a flat surface with two 8-metre-tall (26 ft) obelisks sticking out of it; these obelisks, which frame the end of the path leading up to them, and are now only 6 metres tall, have led to the mountain being colloquially known as Zibb 'Atuf, meaning penis of love in Arabic. Archaeological artifacts discovered at the top of the mountain indicate that it was once covered by polished shiny blue slate, fitting with the biblical description of paved work of sapphire stone; biblical references to sapphire are considered by scholars to be unlikely to refer to the stone called sapphire in modern times, as sapphire had a different meaning, and wasn't even mined, before the Roman era. Unfortunately, the removal of the original peak has destroyed most other archaeological remains from the late Bronze Age (the standard dating of the Exodus) that might previously have been present.

=== Arabian Peninsula ===
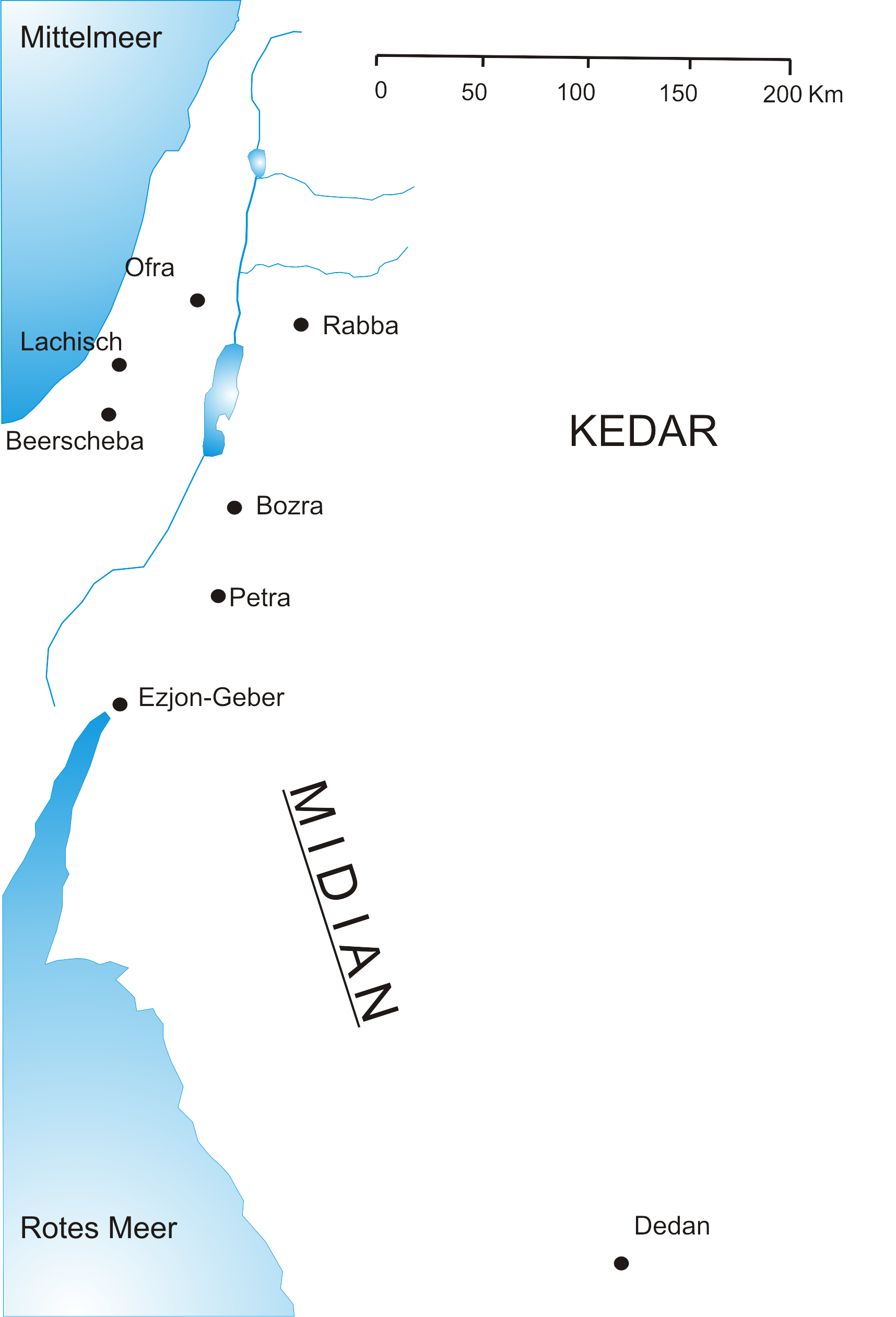
Midian

Some have suggested a site in Saudi Arabia, also noting the Apostle Paul's assertion in the first century CE that Mount Sinai was in Arabia. However, by "Arabia", Paul likely meant the Nabataean Kingdom, which included both the Sinai Peninsula and northwestern Saudi Arabia. He states in Galatians 1:17 that he had been to Arabia, and in 2 Corinthians 11:32 he mentions its king, Aretas IV.

==== A volcano ====
A suggested possible naturalistic explanation of the biblical devouring fire is that Sinai could have been an erupting volcano; this has been suggested by Charles Beke, Sigmund Freud, and Immanuel Velikovsky, among others. This possibility would exclude all the peaks on the Sinai peninsula and Seir, but would make a number of locations in north western Saudi Arabia reasonable candidates. In 1873, C. Beke proposed Jebel Baggir which he called the Jabal al-Nour (meaning mountain of light), a volcanic mountain at the northern end of the Gulf of Aqaba, with Horeb being argued to be a different mountain – the nearby Jebel Ertowa. Beke's suggestion has not found as much scholarly support as the suggestion that Mount Sinai is the el Jaww basin volcano Hala-'l Badr, as advocated by Alois Musil in the early 20th century, J. Koenig, and Colin Humphreys in 2003.

==== Jabal al-Lawz ====
A possible candidate within the Arabia theory has been that of Jabal al-Lawz (meaning 'mountain of almonds'). Advocates for Jabal al-Lawz include L. Möller as well as R. Wyatt, R. Cornuke, and L. Williams. A. Kerkeslager believes that the archaeological evidence is too tenuous to draw conclusions, but has stated that "Jabal al Lawz may also be the most convincing option for identifying the Mt. Sinai of biblical tradition" and should be researched. A number of researchers support this hypothesis while others dispute it. (Note: "The proponents of Jebel al-Lawz do not agree on the crossing site of the Red Sea in the Gulf of Akaba / Eilat. One group, consisting of R. Wyatt, J. Pinkoski, and L. Moller suggests that the Israelites crossed at Nuweiba. The other group, consisting of J. Irwin, R. Cornuke, L. Williams, R. Knuteson, K. Kluetz, and K. Durham argues for the Strait of Tiran." Franz (2007) § "Problems with the Gulf of Akaba / Eilat Crossings")

One of the most recent developments has been the release of a documentary which identifies a peak within the Jabal al-Lawz mountain range, Jabal Maqla, as Mount Sinai; the film includes video and photographic evidence in the project.

Jabal al-Lawz has been rejected by scholars such as J. K. Hoffmeier who details what he calls Cornuke's "monumental blunders" and others. G. Franz published a refutation of this hypothesis.

=== The Negev ===
While equating Sinai with Petra would indicate that the Israelites journeyed in roughly a straight line from Egypt via Kadesh Barnea, and locating Sinai in Saudi Arabia would suggest Kadesh Barnea was skirted to the south, some scholars have wondered whether Sinai was much closer to the vicinity of Kadesh Barnea itself. Halfway between Kadesh Barnea and Petra, in the southwest Negev desert in Israel, is Har Karkom, which Emmanuel Anati excavated, and discovered to have been a major Paleolithic cult centre, with the surrounding plateau covered with shrines, altars, stone circles, stone pillars, and over 40,000 rock engravings; although the peak of religious activity at the site dates to 2350–2000 BCE, the exodus is dated 15 Nisan 2448 (Hebrew calendar; 1313 BCE), and the mountain appears to have been abandoned between 1950 and 1000 BCE, Anati proposed that Jabal Ideid was equatable with biblical Sinai. Other scholars have criticised this identification, as, in addition to being almost 1000 years too early, it also appears to require the wholesale relocation of the Midianites, Amalekites, and other ancient peoples, from the locations where the majority of scholars currently place them.

=== Mount Hermon ===
According to contested research by Israel Knohl (2012), Mount Hermon is actually the Mount Sinai mentioned in the Hebrew Bible, with the biblical story reminiscent of an ancient battle of the northern tribes with the Egyptians somewhere in the Jordan valley or Golan heights.

== In art ==
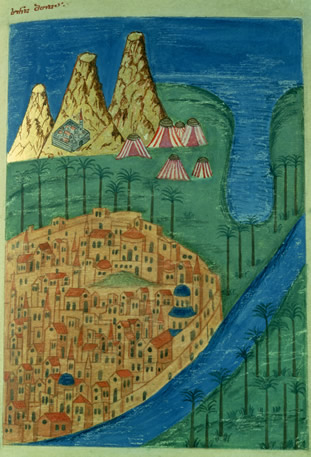
Illumination of Saint Catherine's Monastery on Mount Sinai, from a late medieval Georgian manuscript (Nuskhuri script)

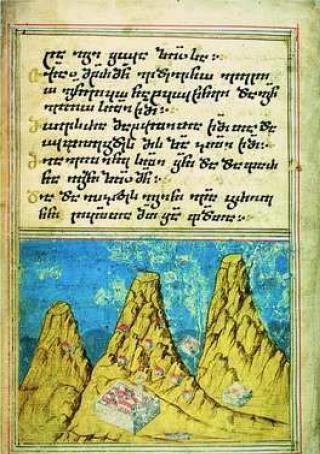
16th-century Georgian Orthodox miniature of Mount Sinai (Nuskhuri script)

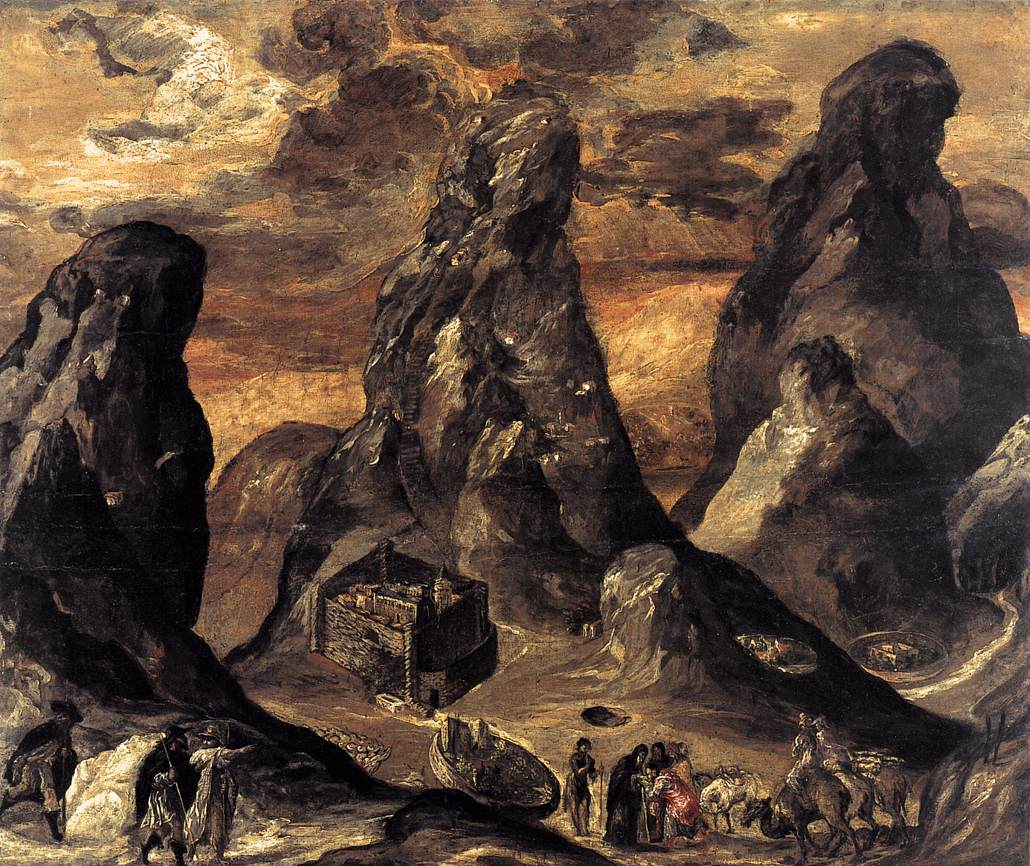
Mount Sinai, painting by El Greco, 1570–1572

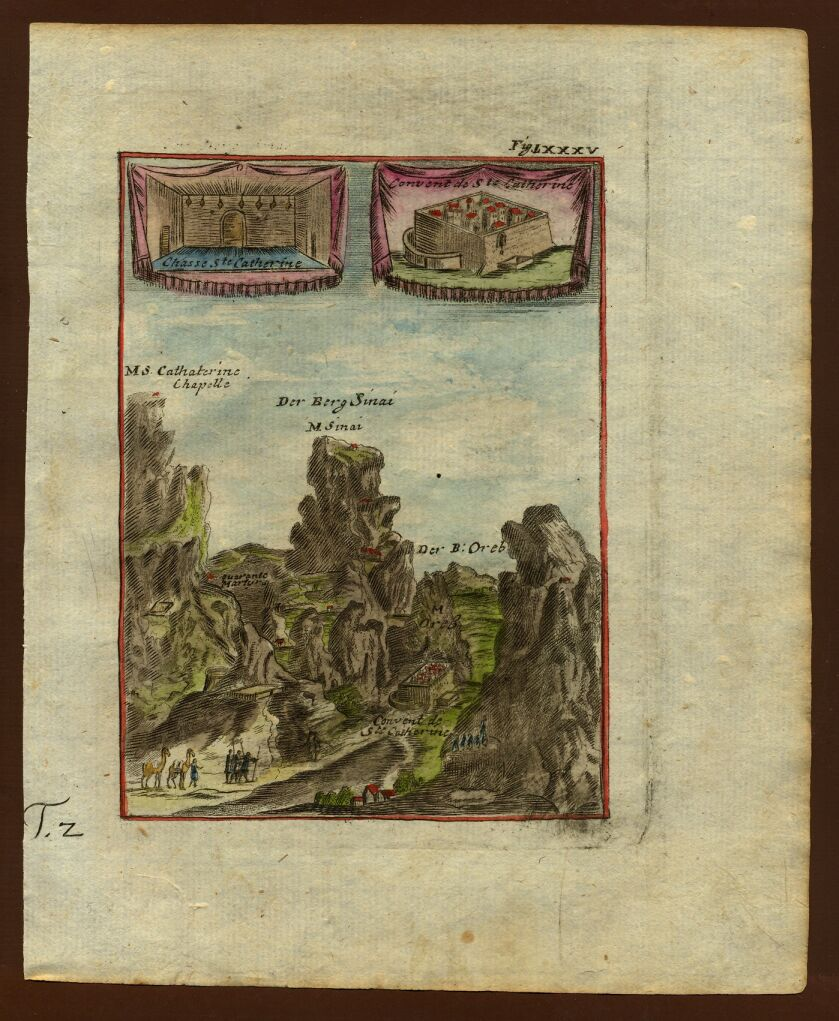
Mount Sinai illustrated by French cartographer Alain Manesson Mallet, 1719

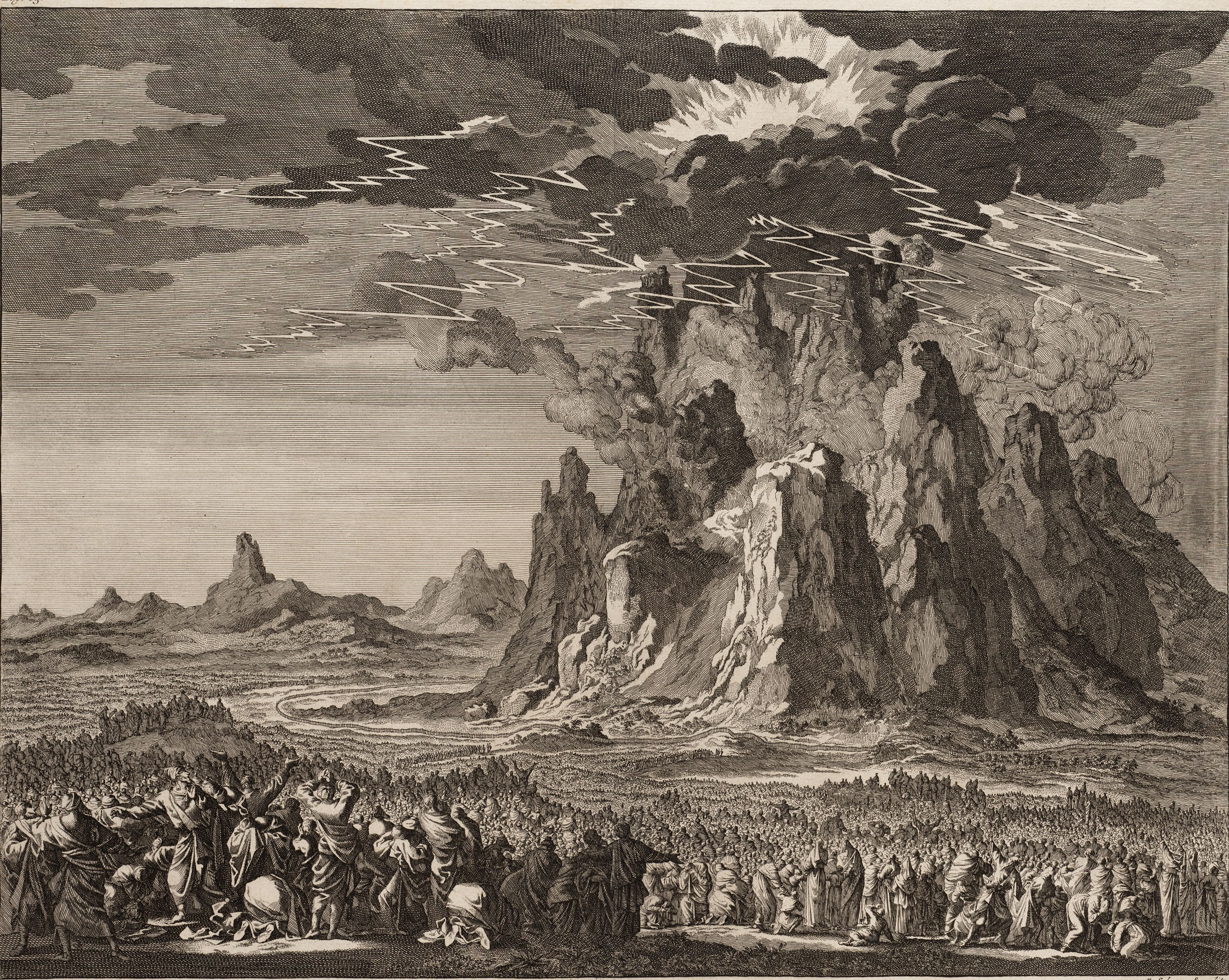
Imaginary depiction of Mount Sinai from a 1723 edition of Antiquitates Iudaicae by Jewish historian Flavius Josephus

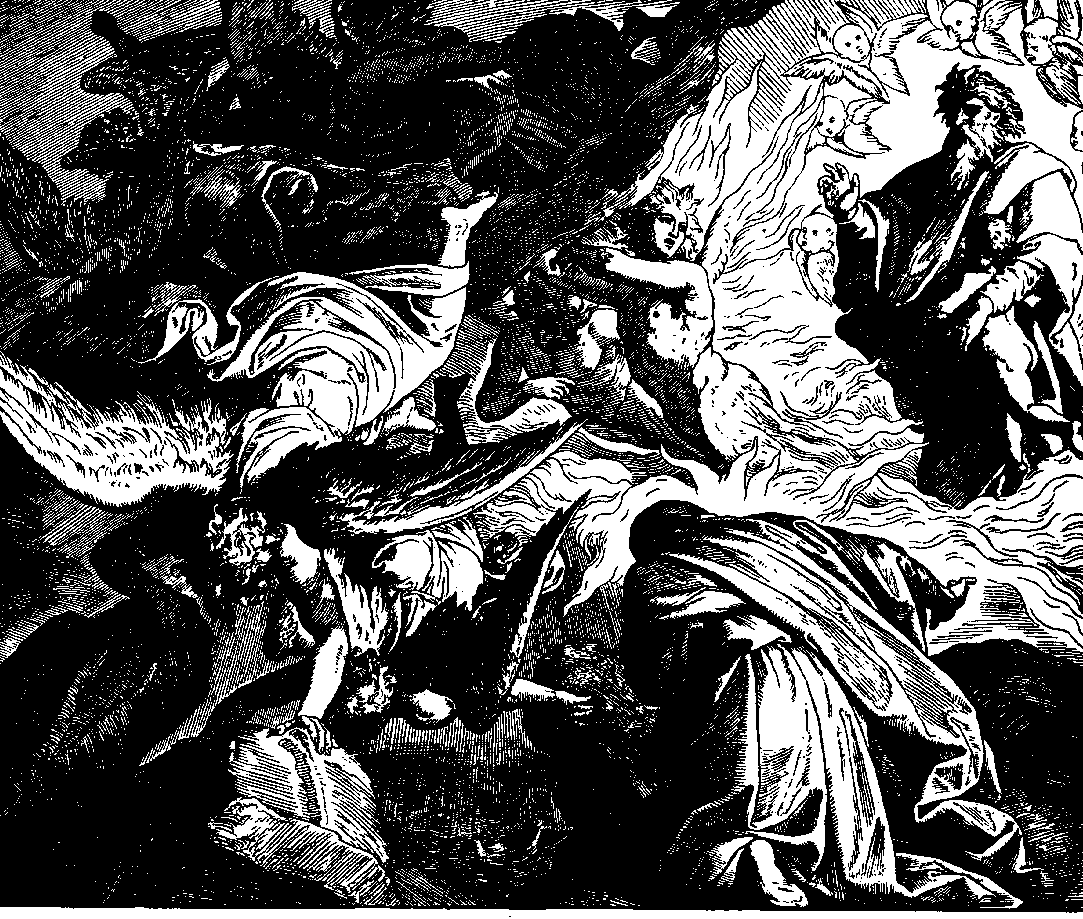
God Appears to Elijah on Mount Horeb, woodcut by Julius Schnorr von Karolsfeld, 1860

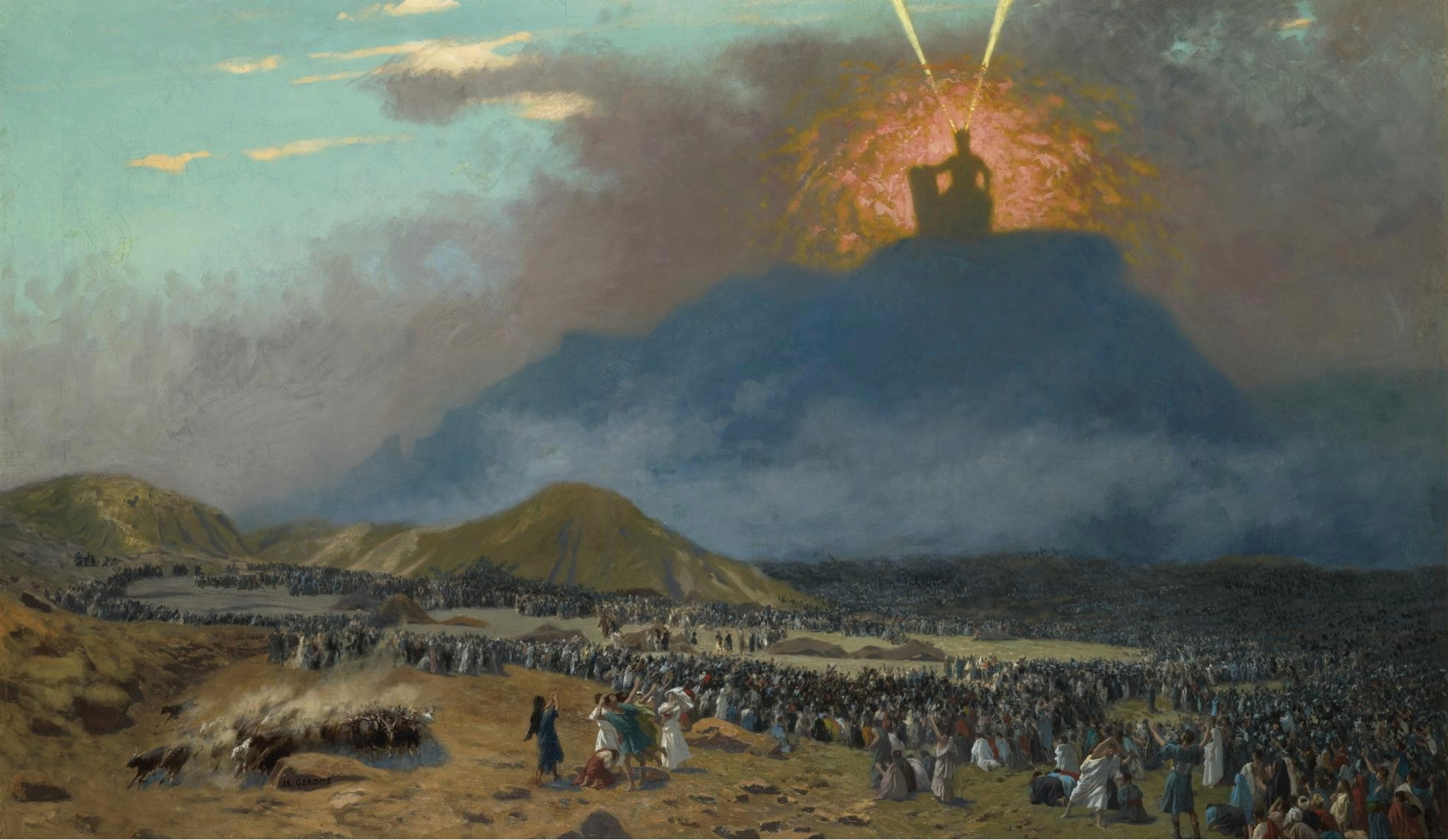
Moses on Mount Sinai, painting by Jean-Léon Gérôme, 1895–1900

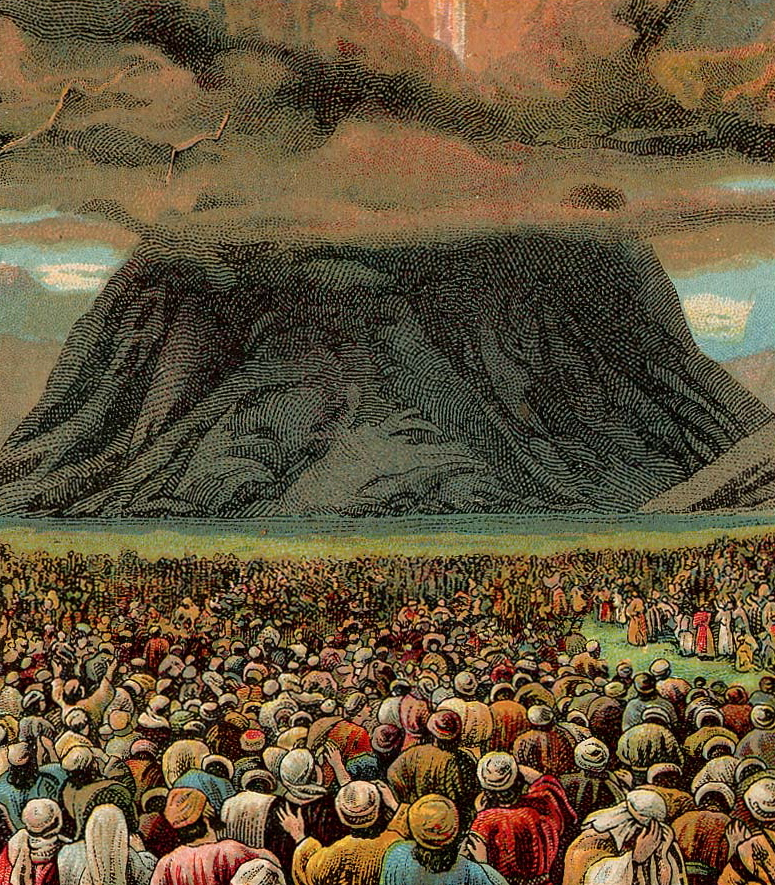
Mass-revelation at Mount Sinai in a Bible card illustration published by the Providence Lithograph Company, 1907

== See also ==
- Christianity in the Middle East
  - Christianity in Egypt
  - Christianity in Israel
  - Christianity in Jordan
  - Christianity in Lebanon
  - Christianity in Palestine
  - Christianity in Syria
- History of Judaism
  - Development of the Hebrew Bible canon
    - Greek Old Testament
    - Masoretic Text
    - Samaritan Torah
  - Law given to Moses at Sinai
  - List of biblical places
  - Revelation at Sinai
  - Stations of the Exodus
- Islamic–Jewish relations
  - Exodus of Jews from Arab and Muslim countries
  - History of the Jews in the Arabian Peninsula
  - Jewish tribes of Arabia
  - Judaism in pre-Islamic Arabia
- List of modern conflicts in the Middle East
  - Arab–Israeli conflict (1948–present)
    - Arab Cold War (1952–1991)
    - Israeli occupation of the Sinai Peninsula (1956–1957, 1967–1982)
    - Jordanian annexation of the West Bank (1948–1967)
    - Six-Day War (1967)
    - Suez Crisis (1956–1957)
  - Egyptian Crisis (2011–2014)
  - Middle Eastern crisis (2023–present)
  - Sinai insurgency (2011–2023)

== Bibliography ==
- Hoffmeier, James K. (6 October 2005). Ancient Israel in Sinai: The evidence for the authenticity of the wilderness tradition. Oxford University Press. ISBN 978-0-19-988260-1.
