= Burning bush =

Supernatural phenomenon described by Exodus 3:1–4:17

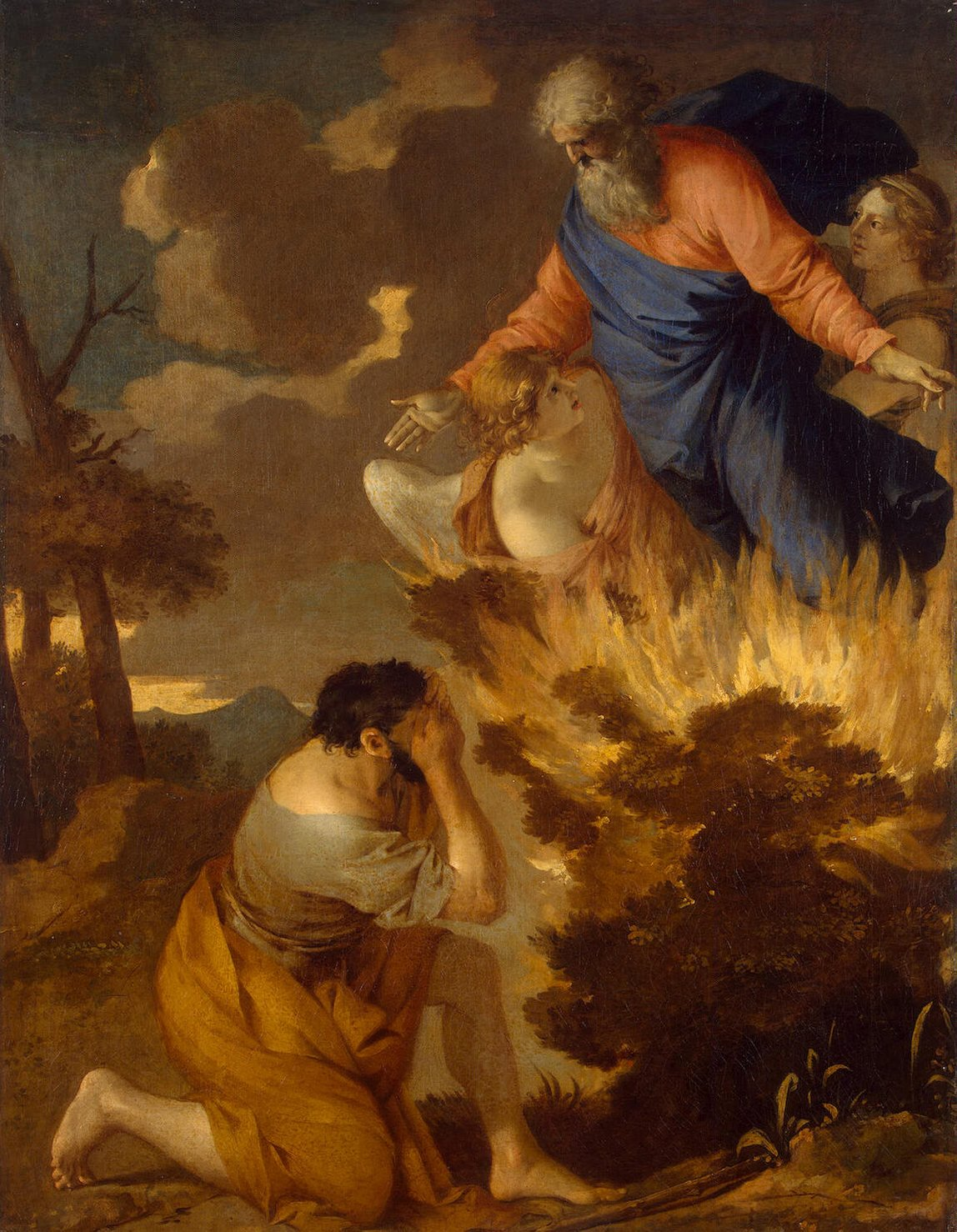
Burning Bush. Seventeenth-century painting by Sébastien Bourdon in the Hermitage Museum, Saint Petersburg

The burning bush (or the unburnt bush) refers to an event recorded in the Jewish Torah (as also in the biblical Old Testament and Islamic scripture). It happened in the mid-15th century BCE (approx. 1514 BCE) or the 13th century BCE (c. 1260 BCE). It is described in the third chapter of the Book of Exodus as having occurred on Mount Horeb. According to the biblical account, the bush was on fire but was not consumed by the flames, hence the name. In the biblical and Quranic narrative, the burning bush is the location at which Moses was appointed by God to lead the Israelites out of Egypt and into Canaan.

The Hebrew word in the narrative that is translated into English as bush is seneh (Hebrew: סְנֶה, romanized: səne), which refers in particular to brambles; seneh is a dis legomenon, only appearing in two places, both of which describe the burning bush. The use of seneh may be a deliberate pun on Sinai (סיני), a feature common in Hebrew texts.

== Biblical narrative ==
In the narrative, an angel of the Lord is described as appearing "in a flame of fire out of the midst of a bush", and God is subsequently described as calling out from it to Moses, who had been grazing Jethro's flocks there. When Moses starts to approach, God tells Moses to take off his sandals first due to the place being a sacred space.

The voice from the bush, which later self-discloses as Yahweh, reveals himself as "the God of Abraham, the God of Isaac, and the God of Jacob" and thus Moses hides his face.

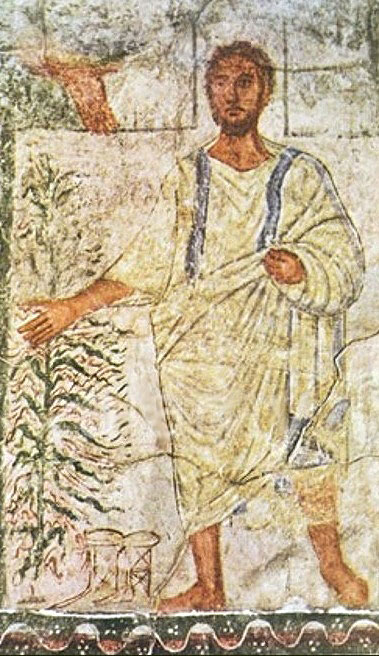
Moses and the burning bush. Painting from Dura-Europos synagogue, third century CE

Some Old Testament scholars regard the account of the burning bush as being spliced together from the Yahwist and Elohist texts, with the angel of Yahweh and the removal of sandals being part of the Yahwist version, and the Elohist's parallels to these being God and the turning away of Moses's face, respectively.

The text portrays Yahweh as telling Moses that he is sending him to Pharaoh to bring the Israelites out of Egypt, an action that Yahweh decided upon as a result of noticing that the Israelites were being oppressed by the Egyptians. Yahweh tells Moses to tell the elders of the Israelites that Yahweh would lead them into the land of the Canaanites, Hittites, Amorites, Hivites, and Jebusites, a region generally referred to as a whole by the term Canaan; this is described as being a land of "milk and honey".

Moses asks "When I come to the Israelites and say to them, ‘The God of your fathers has sent me to you,’ and they ask me, ‘What is His name?’ what shall I say to them?” (Ex 3:13) The voice of God from the bush reveals that he is Yahweh. The text derives Yahweh (יהוה) from the Hebrew word היה ([haˈja]) in the phrase אֶהְיֶה אֲשֶׁר אֶהְיֶה "I Am Who I Am".

According to the narrative, Yahweh instructs Moses to confront the Egyptians and Israelites and briefs the prophet on what is to take place. Yahweh then performs various demonstrative miracles in order to bolster Moses's credibility. Among other things, his staff was transmuted into a snake, Moses's hand was temporarily afflicted with "snowy tzaraath", and water was transmuted into blood. In the text, Yahweh instructs Moses to take a staff in his hands to perform miracles with it, as if it is a staff given to him rather than his own; some textual scholars propose that this latter instruction is the Elohist's version of the more detailed earlier description, where Moses uses his staff, which they attribute to the Yahwist.

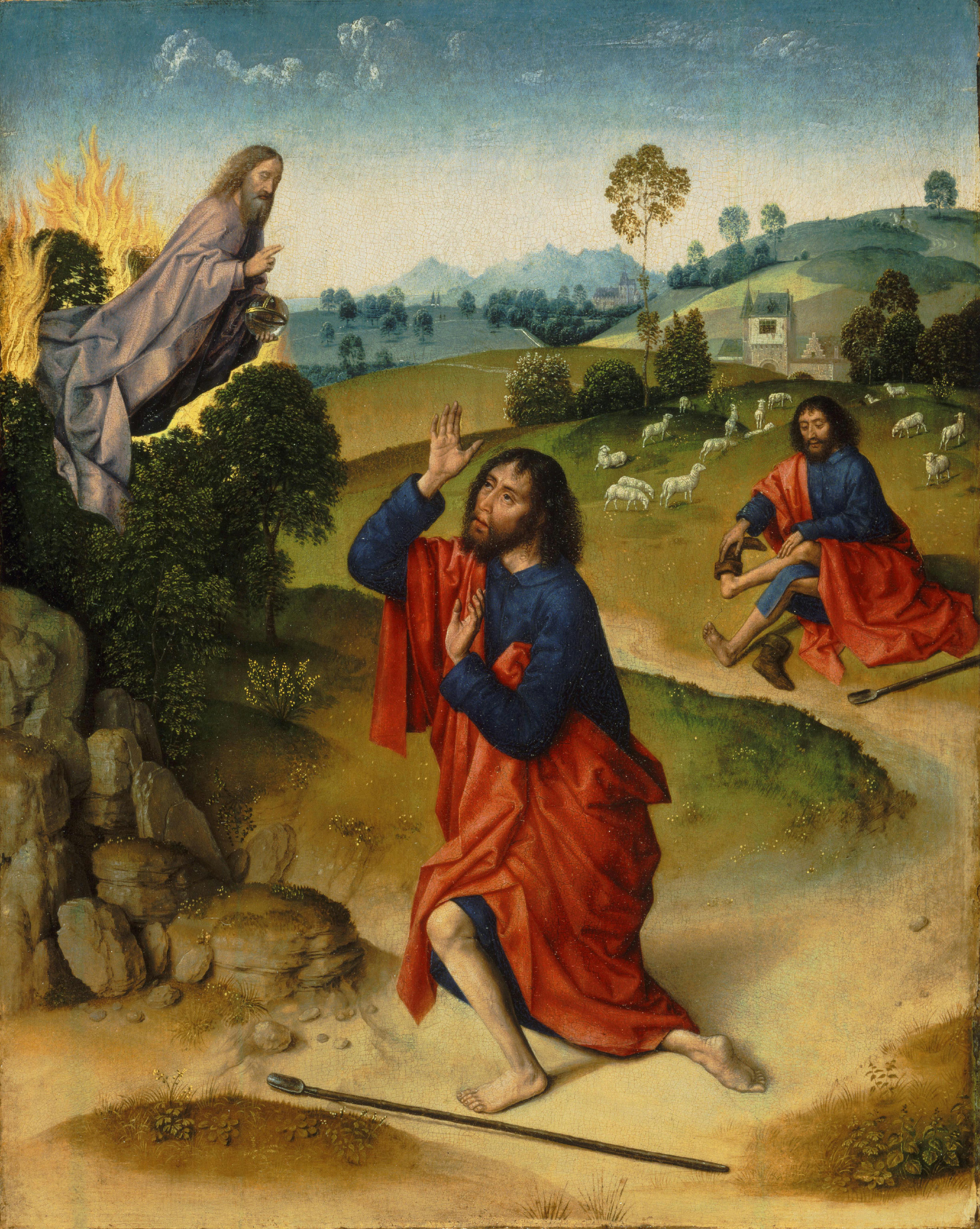
Moses and the Burning Bush, c. 1450–1475, attributed to Dieric Bouts

Despite the signs, Moses is described as being very reluctant to take on the role, arguing that he lacked eloquence and that someone else should be sent instead; in the text, Yahweh reacts by angrily rebuking Moses for presuming to lecture the one who made the mouth on who was qualified to speak and not to speak. Yet Yahweh concedes and allows Aaron to be sent to assist Moses since Aaron is eloquent and already on his way to meet Moses. This is the first time in the Torah that Aaron is mentioned and he is described as being Moses's mouthpiece.

== Alternative theories ==
Alexander and Zhenia Fleisher relate the biblical story of the burning bush to the plant Dictamnus. They write:

Intermittently, under yet unclear conditions, the plant excretes such a vast amount of volatiles that lighting a match near the flowers and seedpods causes the plant to be enveloped by flame. This flame quickly extinguishes without injury to the plant.

They conclude, however, that Dictamnus spp. are not found in the Sinai Peninsula, adding: "It is, therefore, highly improbable that any Dictamnus spp. was a true 'Burning Bush', despite such an attractive rational foundation."

Colin Humphreys replies that "the book of Exodus suggests a long-lasting fire that Moses went to investigate, not a fire that flares up and then rapidly goes out."

Another theory is that it is sunlight on Har Karkom reflected in a surprising way to appear like fire.

== Location ==
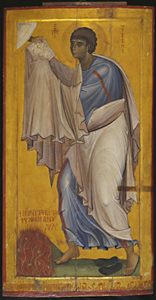
Icon of Moses receiving the Ten Commandments. The bush is depicted at his feet, lower left (Saint Catherine's Monastery, c. 1050)

Christian hermits originally gathered at Mount Serbal, believing it to be the biblical Mount Sinai. However, in the 4th century, under the Byzantine Empire, the monastery built there was abandoned in favour of the newer belief that Mount Saint Catherine was the Biblical Mount Sinai; a new monastery – Saint Catherine's Monastery – was built at its foot, and the alleged site of the biblical burning bush was identified. The bush growing at the spot (a bramble, scientific name Rubus sanctus), was later transplanted several yards away to a courtyard of the monastery, and its original spot was covered by a chapel dedicated to the Annunciation, with a silver star marking where the roots of the bush had come out of the ground. Anyone entering the chapel is required to remove their shoes, just as Moses was said to have done so in the biblical account.

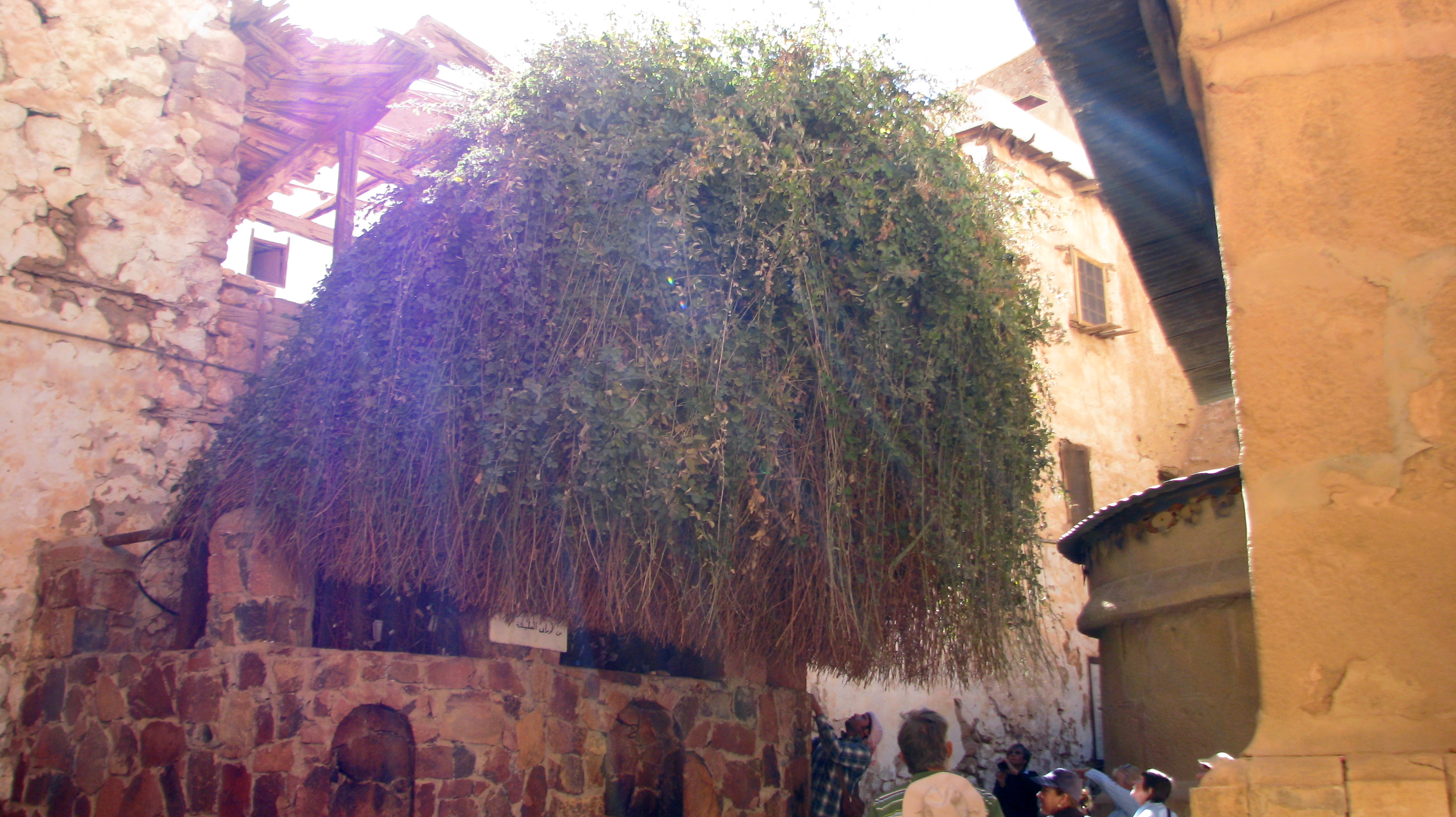
The bush at Saint Catherine's Monastery in the Sinai Peninsula, which monastic tradition identifies as being the burning bush.

However, in modern times, it is not Mount Saint Catherine, but the adjacent Jebel Musa (Mount Moses) which is currently identified as Mount Sinai by popular tradition and guidebooks; this identification arose from Bedouin tradition.

Mount Serbal, Mount Sinai, and Mount Saint Catherine all lie at the southern tip of the Sinai Peninsula, but the peninsula's name is a comparatively modern invention: it was not known by that name at the time of Josephus or earlier. Some modern scholars and theologians favor locations in the Hijaz (at the northwest of Saudi Arabia), northern Arabah (in the vicinity of Petra, or the surrounding area), or occasionally in the central or northern Sinai Peninsula. Hence, the majority of academics and theologians agree that if the Burning Bush ever existed, then it is highly unlikely to be the bush preserved at St Catherine's Monastery.

== Symbolism and interpretations ==
=== Judaism ===
There are many different layers of interpretations for the burning bush in Judaism:

- The fire comes from a thorn bush and not a more majestic tree to show that God saw the suffering of the Jewish people. This interpretation says that Moses was worried that Egypt was going to completely destroy the Israelites. God showed him this magical bush to say that the Israelites will survive, just as the bush is burning but isn’t consumed. The Zohar, a late 1200s work of Kabbalah, also suggests that the burning bush was a hint that even though the Israelites were suffering in Egypt, they had God's protection, like the bush that was burning but not consumed.
- The Mekhilta de Rabbi Shimon Ben Yochai, a major book of commentaries on the Bible's Exodus book, states that just as with a thorn bush, if a person inserts his hand into it, he is not harmed because its thorns point downward. But if he wishes to withdraw his hand, the thorns grasp it. Similarly, when the Israelites descended to Egypt, the Egyptians welcomed them, as it is written in the Bible (Genesis 47:6): "The land of Egypt is before you; in the best of the land make your father and brothers to dwell." But when they wished to leave, the Egyptians held them back, per Exodus 5:2: "I will not let Israel go."
- In the same source, God revealing himself in a simple bush is also meant to show that there is no place on earth, as humble as it can be, devoid of the Divine presence.
- For other commentaries, the burning bush is often interpreted as a representation of Moses’s mission and leadership combining the passion of fire with the humility of a lowly plant.
- Some famous Sages commentaries, such as "Rabbenu Benchaya" (Rabbenu Bahya ibn Paquda, Jewish philosopher and Judge living in Spain between c.1050 and 1120), have outlined the connection between the burning bush and Mount Sinai, based on the Hebrew word for Bush, “Sneh”. It is meant to show the burning bush as a prefiguration of the Great Revelation of God to the Hebrew people after their liberation from Egypt at Mount Sinai. In both instances, God reveals himself through fire. And this revelation is symbolically the end goal of the journey started with the burning bush.

The logo of the Jewish Theological Seminary of America is also an image of the burning bush with the phrase "and the bush was not consumed" in both English and Hebrew.

=== Christianity ===
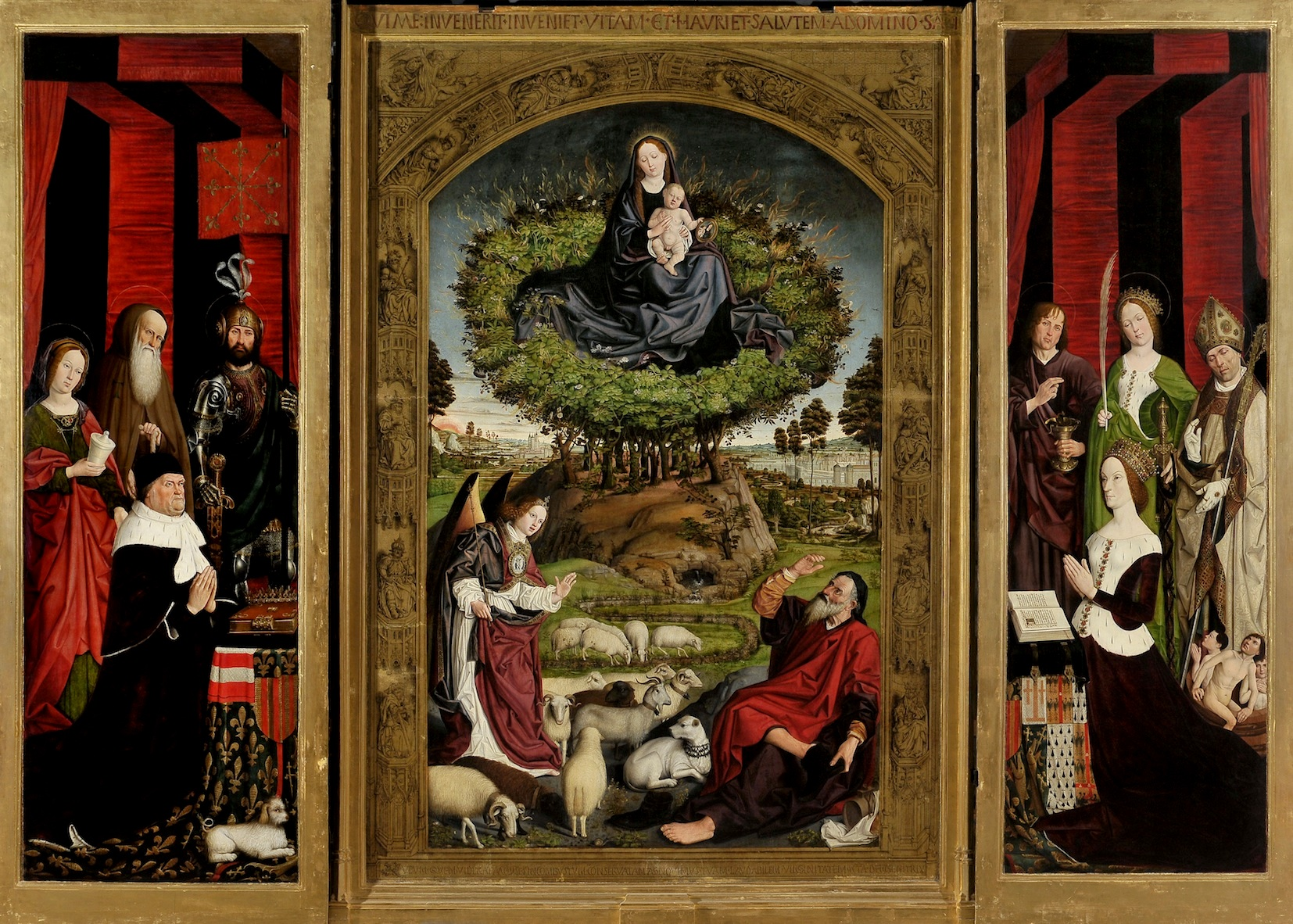
The Burning Bush Triptych, 1475-1476, by Nicolas Froment in Aix Cathedral

==== Catholic Church ====
In the medieval Catholic Church the event was seen as a typological parallel for the Virgin Birth of Jesus from Mary, who conceived as a virgin, as the bush was burnt but not destroyed. Depictions in medieval Catholic art, such as the 15th-century Burning Bush Triptych altarpiece, therefore typically show a Virgin and Child in the middle of the bush or tree. The inscription on the base of the frame which translates (from Latin) as "In the bush which Moses saw burning without being consumed, we recognised, Holy Mother of God, your virginity wondrously preserved". The Eastern Orthodox view was similar.

==== Eastern Orthodoxy ====
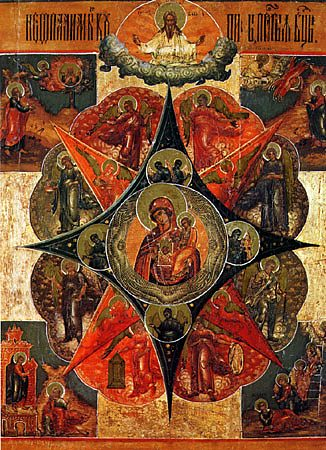
Traditional icon of Our Lady of the Burning Bush (Neopalimaya Kupina).

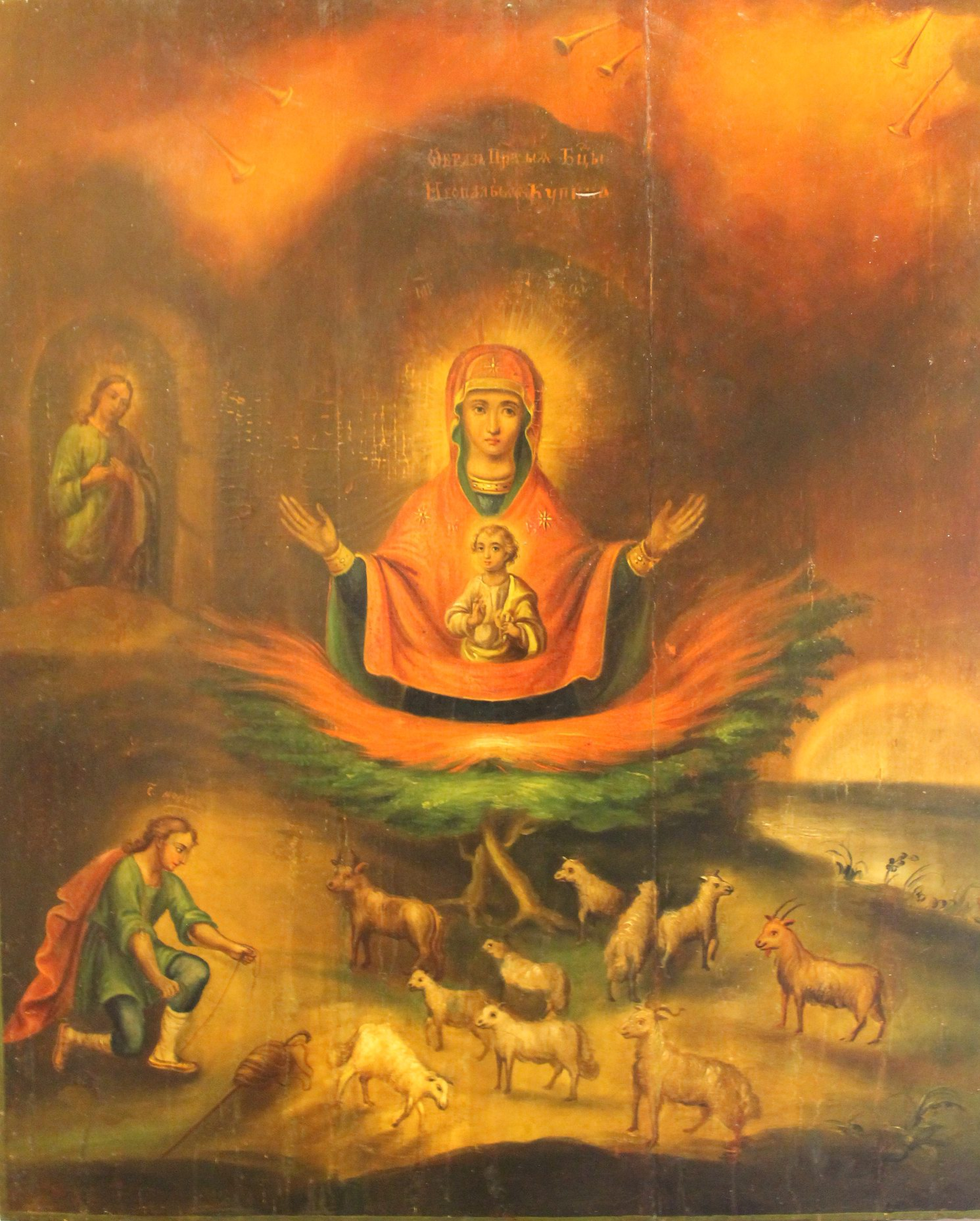
The Icon of the Theotokos "Burning Bush" of the Old Testament. 19th century, Polissya, Ukraine. The Museum of Ukrainian home icons, Radomysl Castle, Ukraine

In Eastern Orthodoxy a tradition exists, originating in the early Christian Church Fathers and its Ecumenical Synods (or Councils), that the flame Moses saw was in fact God's Uncreated Energies/Glory, manifested as light, thus explaining why the bush was not consumed. It is viewed as Moses being permitted to see these Uncreated Energies/Glory, which are considered to be eternal things; the Orthodox definition of salvation is this vision of the Uncreated Energies/Glory, and it is a recurring theme in the works of Greek Orthodox theologians such as John S. Romanides.

In Eastern Orthodox parlance, the preferred name for the event is The Unburnt Bush, and the theology and hymnography of the church view it as prefiguring the virgin birth of Jesus; Eastern Orthodox theology refers to Mary, the mother of Jesus as the Theotokos ("God bearer"), viewing her as having given birth to Incarnate God without suffering any harm, or loss of virginity, in parallel to the bush being burnt without being consumed. There is an icon-type by the name of the Unburnt Bush, which portrays Mary in the guise of God bearer; the icon's feast day is held on 4 September (Russian: Неопалимая Купина, romanized: Neopalimaya Kupina).

While God speaks to Moses, in the narrative, Eastern Orthodoxy believes that the angel was also heard by Moses; Eastern Orthodoxy interprets the angel as being the Logos of God, regarding it as the Angel of Great Counsel mentioned in the Septuagint version of Isaiah 9:6; (it is Counsellor, Mighty God in the Masoretic Text).

==== Reformed tradition ====
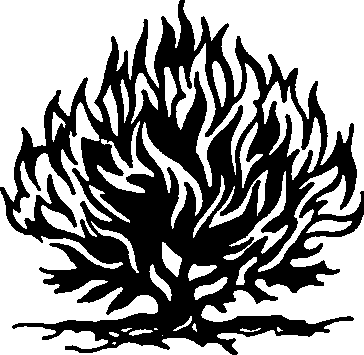
Burning bush used by the Presbyterian Church in Ireland.

The burning bush has been a popular symbol among Reformed churches since it was first adopted by the Huguenots (French Calvinists) in 1583 during its 12th National Synod. The French motto Flagror non consumor – "I am burned but not consumed" – suggests the symbolism was understood of the suffering church that nevertheless lives. However, given the fire is a sign of God's presence, he who is a consuming fire (Hebrews 12:29) the miracle appears to point to a greater miracle: God, in grace, is with his covenant people and so they are not consumed.

- The current symbol of the Reformed Church of France is a burning bush with the Huguenot cross.
- The motto of the Church of Scotland is Nec tamen consumebatur, Latin for "Yet it was not consumed", an allusion to the biblical description of the burning bush, and a stylised depiction of the burning bush is used as the Church's symbol. Usage dates from the 1690s. A similar logo is used by the Free Church of Scotland (Continuing). The Free Church of Scotland (since 1900) uses a highly simplified version.
- The burning bush is also used as the basis of the symbol of the Presbyterian Church in Ireland, which uses the Latin motto Ardens sed virens, meaning "Burning but flourishing", and is based on the biblical description of the burning bush. The same logo is used from the separated Free Presbyterian Church of Ulster. The Non-subscribing Presbyterian Church of Ireland uses the burning bush without the motto.
- The burning bush is also the symbol of the Presbyterian Church in Canada, Presbyterian Church in Australia crest, Presbyterian Church of Eastern Australia with the motto in English since its foundation in 1846: 'And the Bush was not consumed', Presbyterian Church in New Zealand, Presbyterian Church in Taiwan, Presbyterian Church in Singapore, Presbyterian Church of Brazil, the Presbyterian Church in Malaysia, the Free Reformed Churches of North America, and the Christian Reformed Churches in the Netherlands.

=== Islam ===
According to the Qur’án, Moses (Musa) departed for Egypt along with his family after completing the time period. The Qur’án states that during their travel, as they stopped near the Tur, Musa observed a fire and instructed the family to wait until he returned with fire for them. When Musa reached the Valley of Tuwa, God called out to him from the right side of the valley from a tree, on what is revered as Al-Buq‘ah Al-Mubārakah (Arabic: الـبُـقـعَـة الـمُـبَـارَكَـة, "The Blessed Ground") in the Qur’án. The sacred valley of Tuwa is mentioned in the Qur’án at 20:12 and 79:16. Musa was commanded by God to remove his shoes and was informed of his selection as a prophet, his obligation of prayer and the Day of Judgment. Musa was then ordered to throw his rod which turned into a snake and later instructed to hold it. The Qur’án then narrates Musa being ordered to insert his hand into his clothes and upon revealing it would shine a bright light. God states that these are signs for the Pharaoh, and orders Musa to invite Pharaoh to the worship of one God.

=== Baháʼí Faith ===
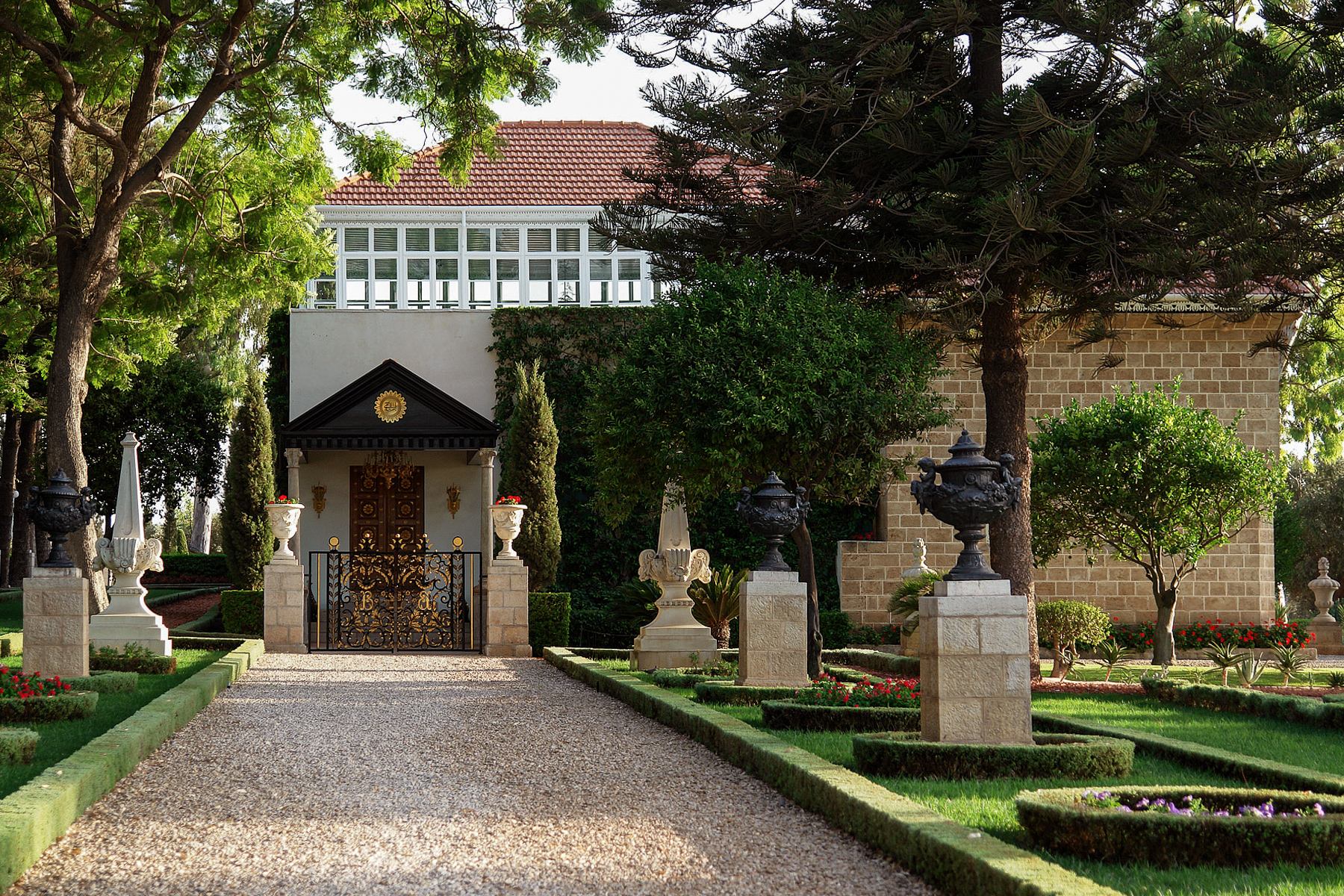
Shrine of Bahá'u'lláh located in Bahjí near Acre, Israel

The Baháʼí Faith understands the Burning Bush to represent the Voice of God. The term Burning Bush appears frequently in the writings of Bahá’u’lláh, the Prophet-Founder of the faith. In the teachings of the Baháʼí Faith, the Voice of God as spoken from the Burning Bush, is now, through the Revelation of Bahá’u’lláh, speaking directly to humanity; “a Revelation,” Bahá’u’lláh proclaims, "the potency of which hath caused every tree to cry out what the Burning Bush had aforetime proclaimed unto Moses.”

In recounting the association between Moses and the Burning Bush, Bahá’u’lláh writes,

Call thou to mind the days when He Who conversed with God tended, in the wilderness, the sheep of Jethro, His father-in-law. He hearkened unto the Voice of the Lord of mankind coming from the Burning Bush which had been raised above the Holy Land, exclaiming, “O Moses! Verily I am God, thy Lord and the Lord of thy forefathers, Abraham, Isaac and Jacob.” He was so carried away by the captivating accent of the Voice that He detached Himself from the world and set out in the direction of Pharaoh and his people, invested with the power of thy Lord Who exerciseth sovereignty over all that hath been and shall be. The people of the world are now hearing that which Moses did hear, but they understand not. -from Tablets of Bahá’u’lláh

=== Rastafari ===
Some Rastafari believe that the burning bush was cannabis.

== See also ==
- Aaron's rod
- Ark of the Covenant
- Staff of Moses
- Theophany
