= Burning Bush Triptych =

Triptych by Nicolas Froment

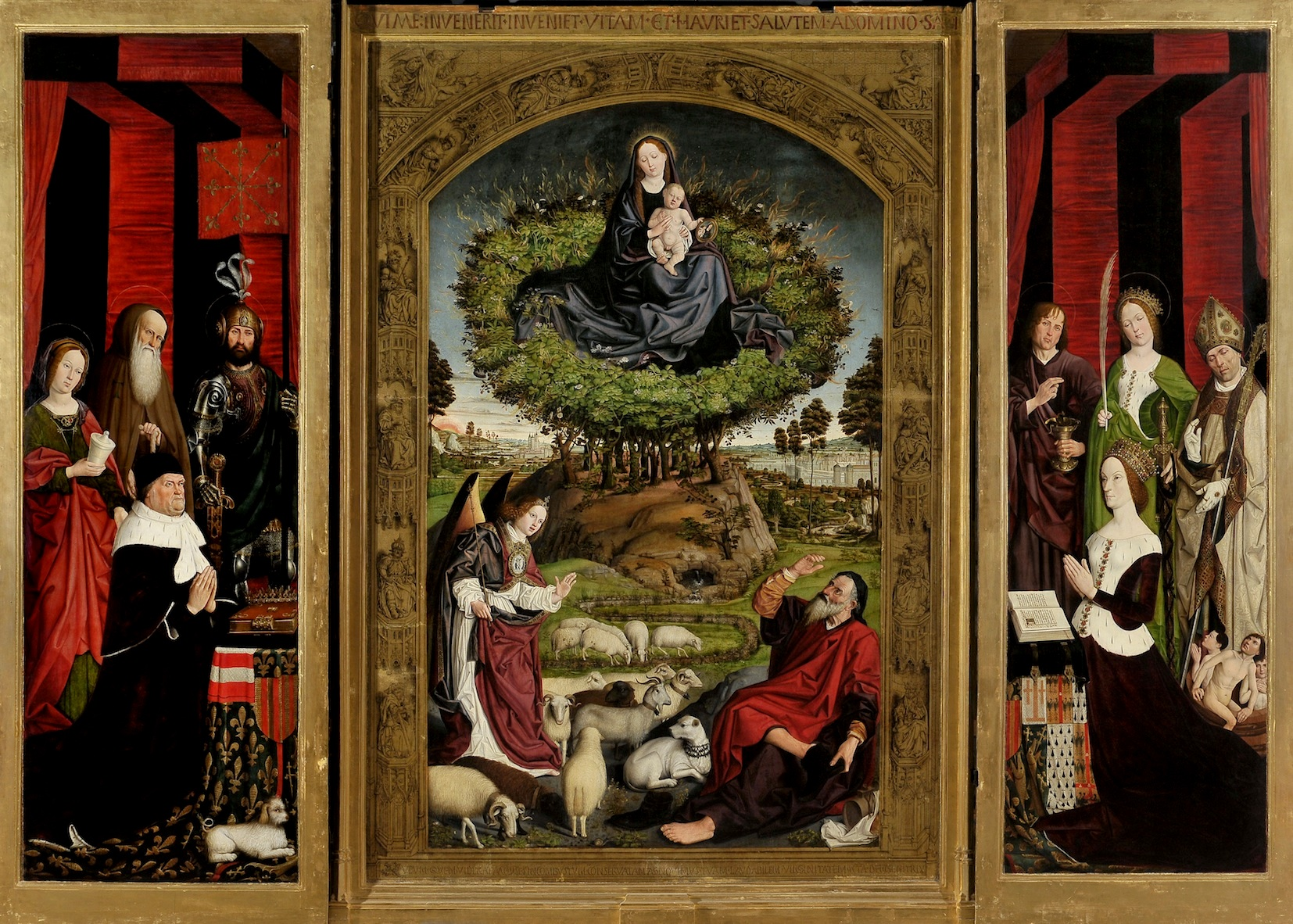
Open view

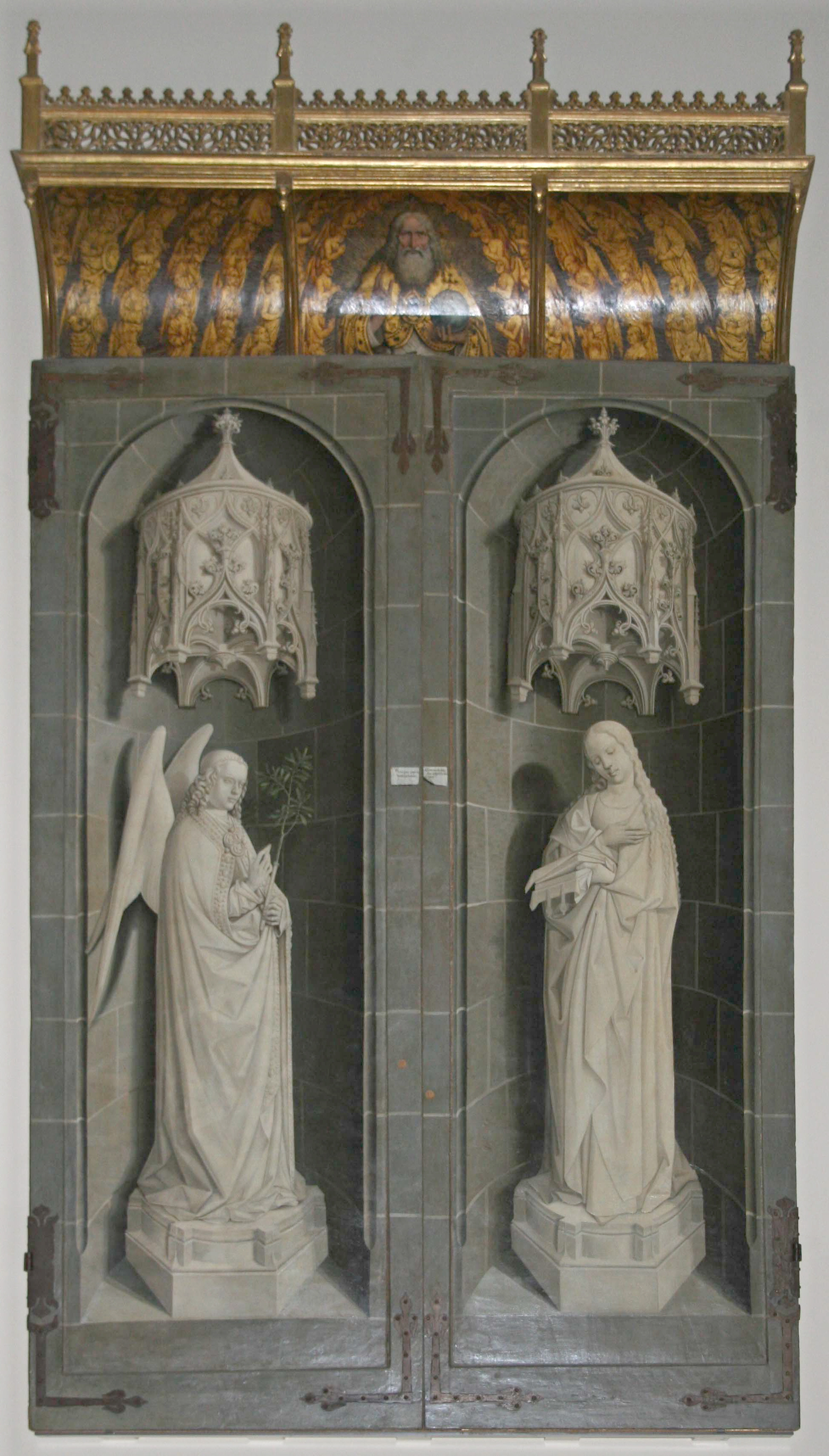
The closed triptych

The Burning Bush Triptych is a 1475-1476 oil on panel triptych by Nicolas Froment in Aix Cathedral.

Weighing half a ton, René of Anjou commissioned it in 1476 for the tomb designed for his entrails. It originally stood on the altarpiece in the Grands-Carmes convent, destroyed in 1792 during the French Revolution, when it was moved to Aix Cathedral in 1808. After a restoration it was reinstalled in the cathedral's Saint-Lazare chapel late in January 2011.

== Description ==
=== Outer panels ===
A trompe-l’œil grisaille on its outer panels shows the Annunciation, with Gabriel and Mary's words inscribed on scrolls in the centre and Gabriel holding an olive branch with twelve olives, a symbol of peace. Opened, the left panel shows René wearing his coats of arms (Hungary, Sicily, Anjou and Aragon), kneeling and wearing the habit of the canons of the Abbey of St Victor. Around him are his patron saints Mary Magdalene, Anthony the Great and Maurice carrying the banner of the Ordre du Croissant, founded by René. Facing him on the right hand panel is his wife Jeanne de Laval, kneeling before her prayer book and backed by John the Apostle, Catherine of Alexandria and Nicholas of Myra.

=== Central panel ===
This shows the Madonna and Child on the Burning Bush from the Book of Exodus, with Moses in the right foreground looking at the vision. The town in the right background evokes Avignon, whilst the castle on the left may be René's château de Saumur in Anjou. The scene is full of symbols, including the ewes, vegetation, gestures, mirror, clothes, rising sun, river, beasts and colours, along with the rock (a biblical image of God) out of which the bush's twelve fig branches grow. The medallion on the angel's chest shows Adam and Eve, whose original sin was redeemed due to Mary's bearing of Christ.

A painted frame around the central panel shows the twelve Kings of Judah, with an inscription on the base of the frame which translates as "In the bush which Moses saw burning without being consumed, we recognised, Holy Mother of God, your virginity wondrously preserved". At its top is another inscription which translates as "Whoever finds me will find life and draw salvation from the bosom of God", a free translation of Proverbs 8: 35 alluding to the believers saved by their faith.
