= Daret =

Daret is a surname. Notable people with the surname include:

- Jacques Daret (c. 1404–c. 1470), Flemish painter
- Jean Daret (1613–1668), Flemish artist
- Pierre Daret (1604–1678), French painter and engraver
- Reno Jean Daret III (b. 1948) American philatelist
