= The Raising of Lazarus (Froment) =

Triptych by Nicolas Froment

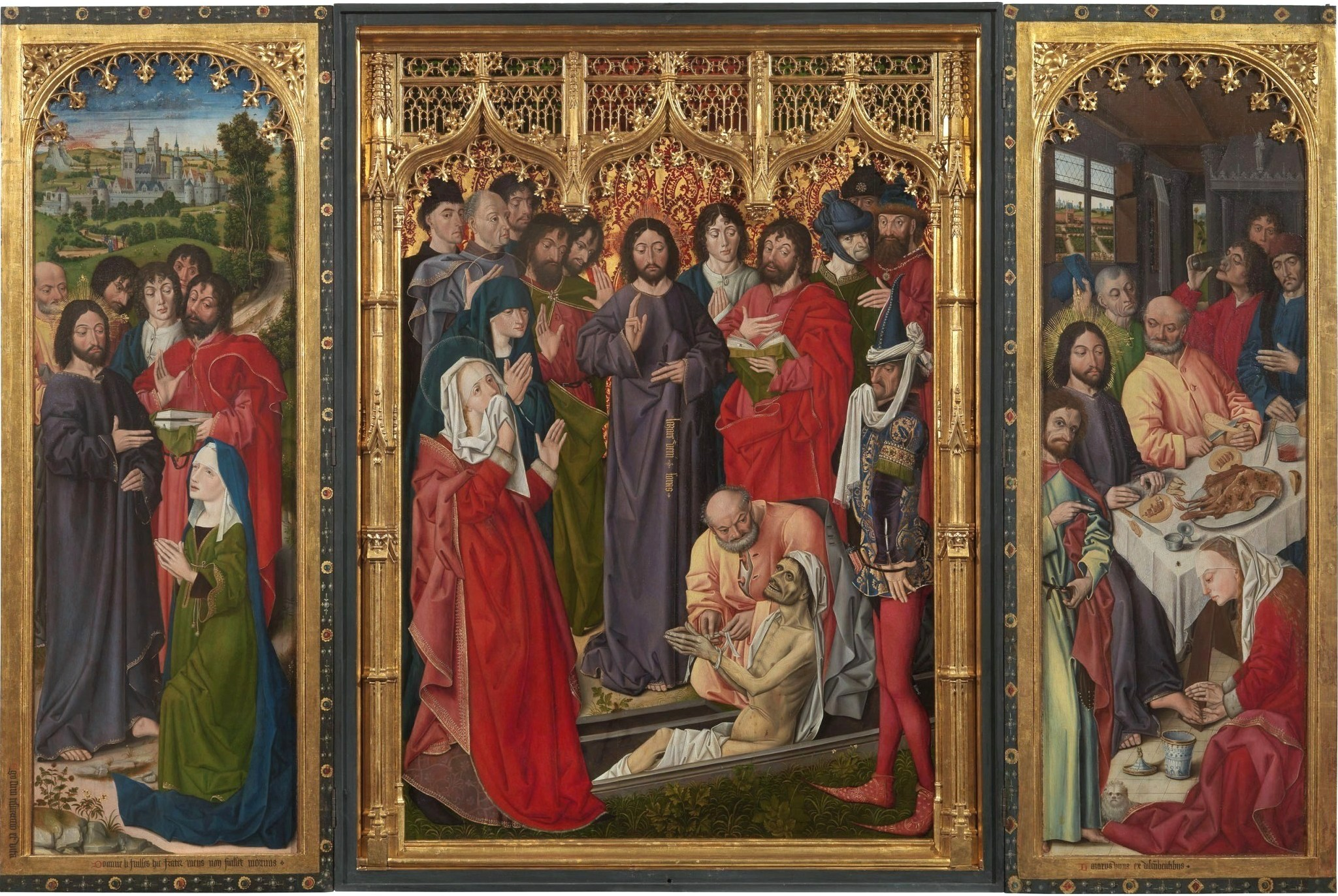

The Raising of Lazarus is a 1461 three-panel oil on oak panel altarpiece by the French painter Nicolas Froment, now inventory number 1065 in the Uffizi Gallery in Florence, which restored it in 2017.

The central panel shows the resurrection itself, with one side panel showing Christ welcomed by Lazarus' sisters Mary and Martha and the other showing Christ's feet being washed in the house of the Pharisee. When closed, the side panels show portraits of the work's commissioner Francesco Coppini (bishop of Prato and papal legate to Pope Pius II in Flanders and England) praying with two of his servants before an image of the Madonna and Child. The work is also signed Nicolaus Frumenti absolvit hoc opus XV HL. Junii M^{o}CCCC^{o}LXI on the exterior. It remains in its original Flemish-style frame with a set of light gilded arches inspired by the arcades of Gothic architecture seen in French cathedrals of the time.

Coppini himself gave the work to Cosimo de' Medici, who in turn gave it to the Franciscans at Convento del Bosco ai Frati (now the site of the town of Scarperia e San Piero) in Mugello between 1461 and 1464. The work arrived in the Uffizi in 1841 after the religious houses were suppressed.

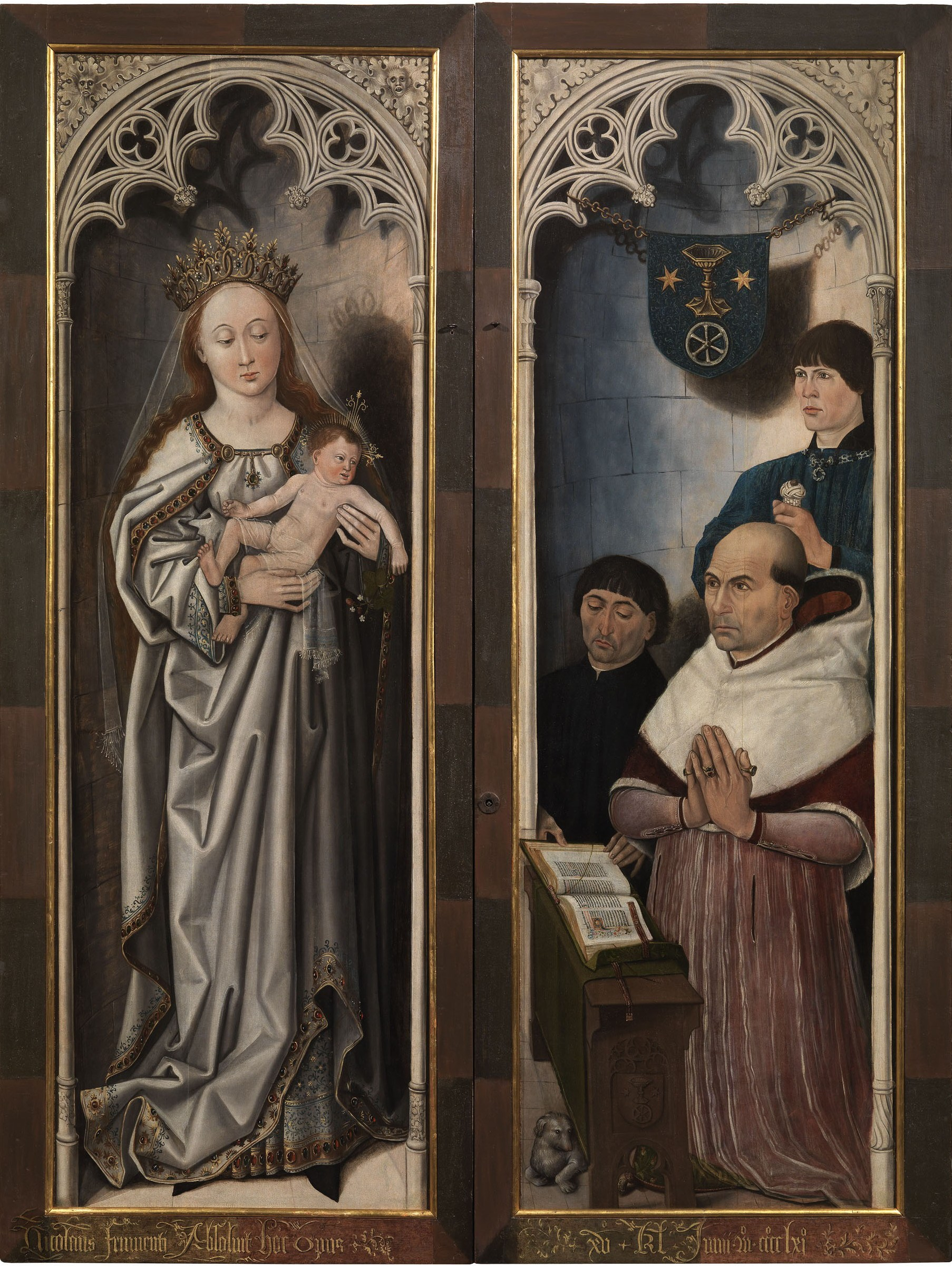
The outside of the side panels

== Exhibition history ==
- Exhibition of French art 1200–1900, London, 1932
- La peinture française à Florence, Florence, 1945
- Les primitifs méditerranéens, Bordeaux, 1952
- Pittura francese nelle collezioni pubbliche fiorentine, Florence, 1977
- Resurrezione di Lazzaro, Florence, (Uffizi-Sala del Camino), 2017

== Bibliography ==
- (in French) Jean-Louis Vaudoyer, Les peintres provençaux de Nicolas Froment à Paul Cézanne, Paris, Jeune Parque, 1947, SBN IT\ICCU\LO1\0566189.
- (in Italian) Gallerie degli Uffizi, Gli Uffizi: Catalogo generale, Firenze, Centro Di, 1980, p. 273 [1979], SBN IT\ICCU\RAV\0060995
