= Aix Cathedral =

Historic Roman Catholic cathedral in Aix-en-Provence, France

Aix Cathedral Cathédrale Saint-Sauveur d'Aix-en-Provence
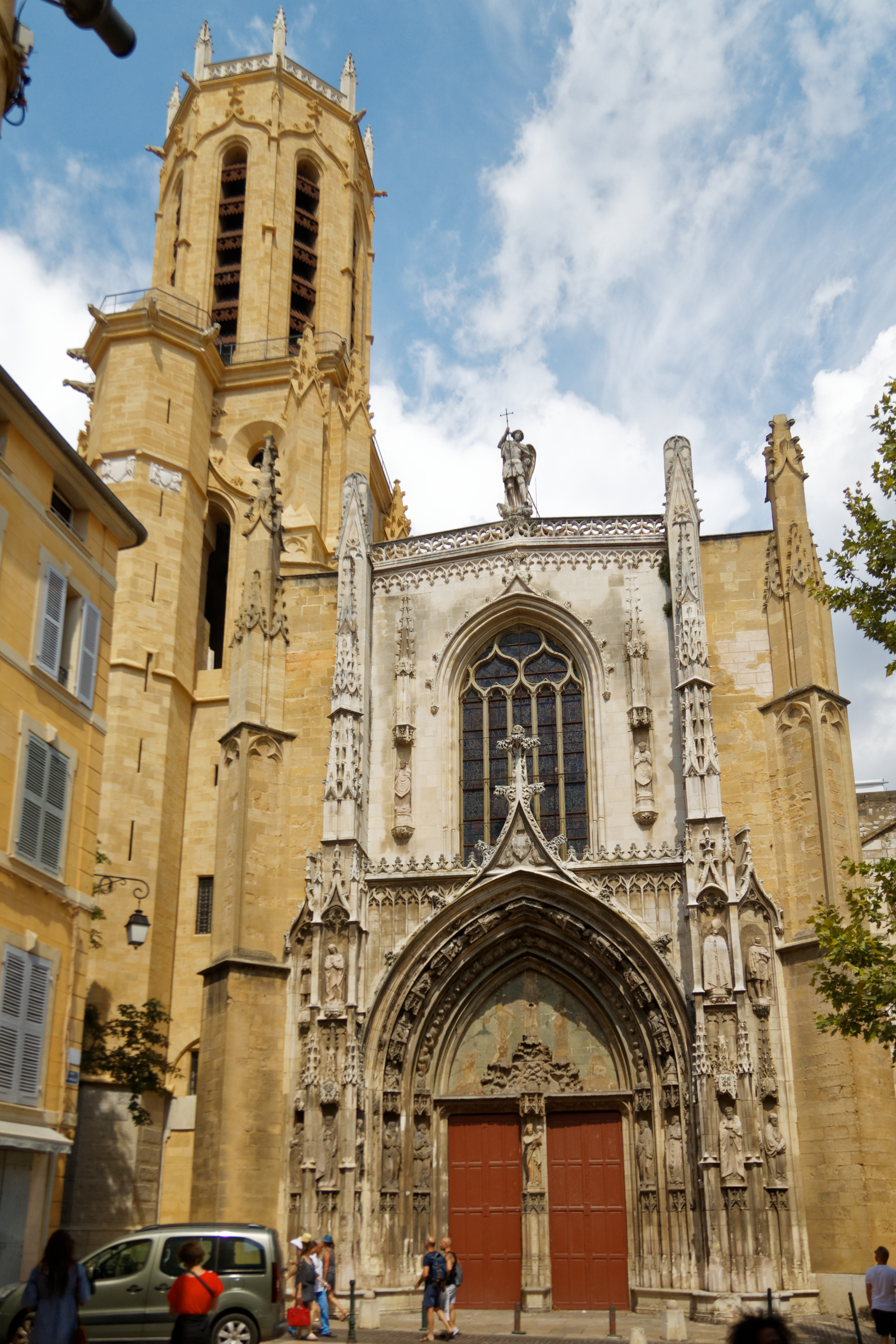
- Aix Cathedral

Religion
- Affiliation: Roman Catholic
- Province: Archdiocese of Aix-en-Provence and Arles
- Ecclesiastical or organisational status: Cathedral
- Status: Active

Location
- Location: Aix-en-Provence, France
- Interactive map of Aix Cathedral; Cathédrale Saint-Sauveur d'Aix-en-Provence
- Coordinates: 43°31′55″N 5°26′50″E

Architecture
- Type: church
- Style: Romanesque, Gothic
- Groundbreaking: 500; 1526 years ago
- Completed: 1513; 513 years ago

Specifications
- Length: 70 metres (230 ft)
- Width: 46 metres (151 ft)

Website
- Official site of the Cathedral

Aix Cathedral (French: Cathédrale Saint-Sauveur d'Aix-en-Provence) in Aix-en-Provence in southern France is a Roman Catholic church and the seat of the Archbishop of Aix-en-Provence and Arles. The cathedral is built on the site of the 1st-century Roman forum of Aix. Built and re-built from the 12th until the 19th century, it includes Romanesque, Gothic and Neo-Gothic elements, as well as Roman columns and parts of the baptistery from a 6th-century Christian church. It is a national monument of France.

== Origin of the cathedral ==
The cathedral is located on the route of the Roman road, the Via Aurelia. A fragment of a Roman wall and the columns of the baptistery seem to be the origin of the legend that the church was built on top of a Roman temple dedicated to Apollo. The historian Scholastique Pitton (1668) claimed that the temple had been dedicated to a sun god, basing his claim upon the discovery of the leg of a statue uncovered at the site.

According to the Christian tradition, the first church on the site was founded by Saint Maximinus of Aix, who arrived in Provence from Bethany, a village near Jerusalem, with Mary Magdalene on a boat belonging to Lazarus. Maximin built a modest chapel on the site of the present cathedral and dedicated it to the Holy Saviour (le Saint Sauveur).

During the invasion of the Saracens in the 8th and 9th centuries, the original chapel of Saint-Sauveur was destroyed.

== Construction of the cathedral ==
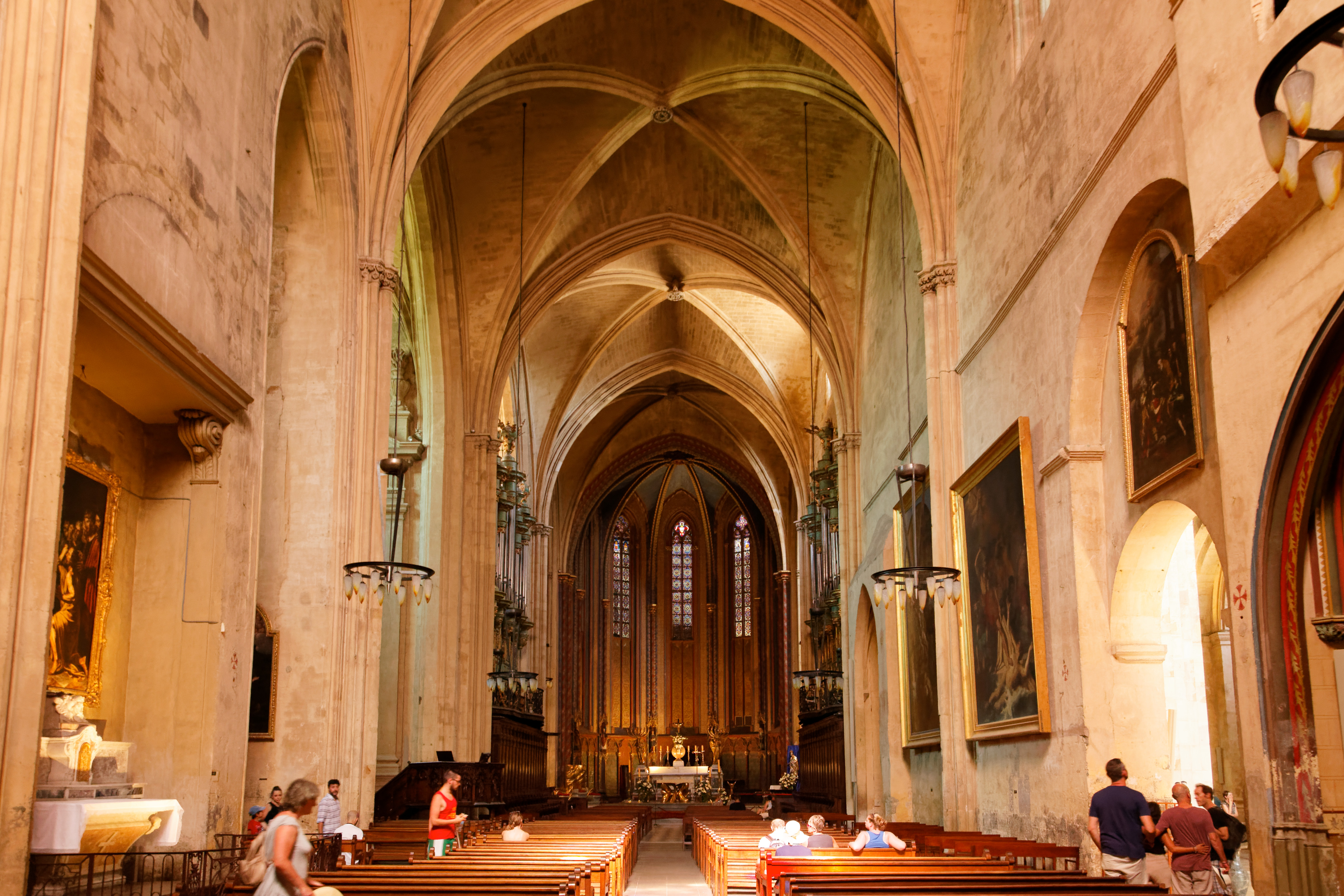
Interior of Aix Cathedral

Around the year 500, under the bishop Basilius, a group of episcopal buildings was constructed on top of the old Roman forum, including a chapel, a baptistery and several other rooms.

At the beginning of the 12th century, a new church was begun on the same site, with Romanesque walls bearing the three bays of a wide single nave, constituting a parish church dedicated to the Virgin Mary (Notre Dame de la Sède).

A second nave, dedicated to Saint Maximinus, was built in about 1165–1177 as the church of the canons, which was located between the first nave and the baptistery. The choir of this church ended in a flat chevet wall, which connected by a door with the Sainte-Chapelle, part of the original 6th century episcopal buildings. The chapel was rebuilt in the 12th century, and when the Gothic nave was added, was incorporated into the cathedral and became the oratory of the Saviour. It was destroyed in 1808.

At the end of the 12th century and beginning of the 13th century, Aix became the capital of Provence, and the city's population and importance grew rapidly. Religious orders began to arrive; the Franciscans first, then the Dominicans, Carmelites, and Augustinians, building new churches, monasteries and convents.

A surge of construction on the cathedral paralleled the growth of importance of Aix. Two new wings of the transept, built in the Gothic style, were begun in about 1285–1290, and finished in 1316. Bay by bay, the old Romanesque church was transformed into a Gothic cathedral.

The building of the new church was interrupted by the Black Death and then the Hundred Years' War. Work did not resume for 130 years, until 1472, when the last bay was built. The façade took another thirty years, and the last statues were not put in place until 1513, at the beginning of the Renaissance.

=== Façade and bell tower ===
The original Romanesque front of Saint Mary's nave was destroyed in the 15th century, and replaced with a new Gothic front and a bell tower.

The façade features four statues by Jean Mone, made in 1512–1513, on the middle level: Saint Mitre (carrying his head); Saint Mary Magdalene, (carrying a flask of perfume); the boy-bishop Saint Louis of Toulouse (d. 1297), the brother of Robert of Naples, Count of Provence 1309–1343; and the other Saint Louis, King Louis IX of France (d. 1270), his great-uncle.

Jacotin Paproche, from Picardy, sculpted the ten small prophets and twenty cherubim (1484) on the façade. Pierre Souquet created the two statues on the upper level, representing the first two bishops of Aix, traditionally named as Maximinus and Sidonius.

The centrepiece of the façade is Saint Michael Crushing the Dragon (1507), by Jean Paumier, from Burgundy.

The façade originally also included twelve statues of the apostles and six statues on the tympanum, which were destroyed during the French Revolution.

=== Carved doors ===
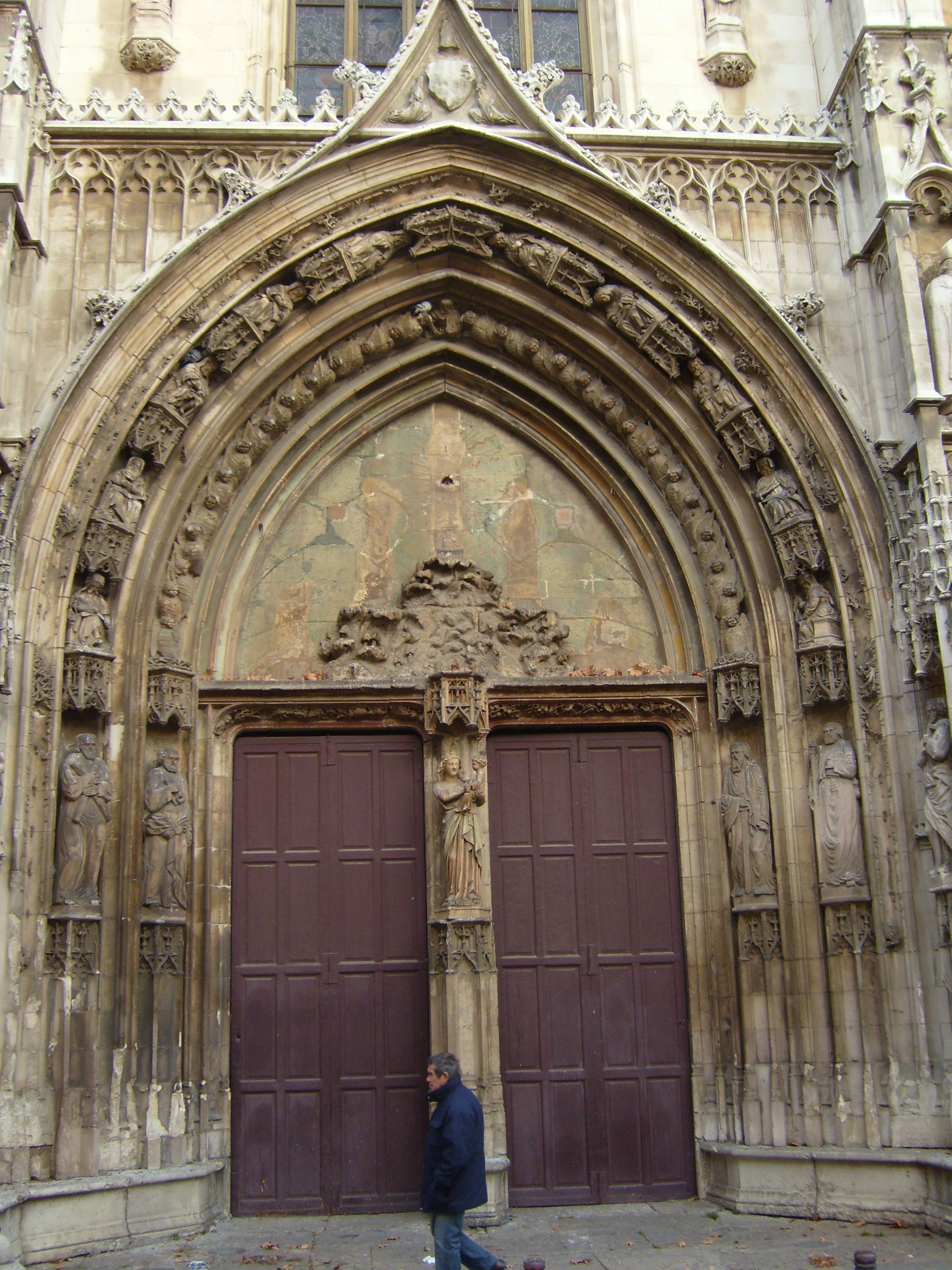
Portal of Aix Cathedral

The doors of the cathedral were commissioned by the chapter in 1505, and were carved of walnut by the brothers Raymond and Jean Bolhit of Aix and by the Toulon sculptor Jean Guiramand.

The doors feature four figures in high relief of the major prophets of the Old Testament (Isaiah, Ezekiel, Daniel and Jeremiah).

Above the prophets are the figures of twelve Sybils, pagan fortune-tellers from antiquity, honoured by medieval Christian scholars for having forecast the birth, death and resurrection of Christ.

The figures are framed with garlands of pomegranates and acorns, bunches of grapes, symbols of the Eucharist, a lion, a dragon and other fantastic animals: an aspic (another type of dragon) and a basilisk, a cock with the tail of a snake, representing the battle between good and evil.

=== Baptistery ===
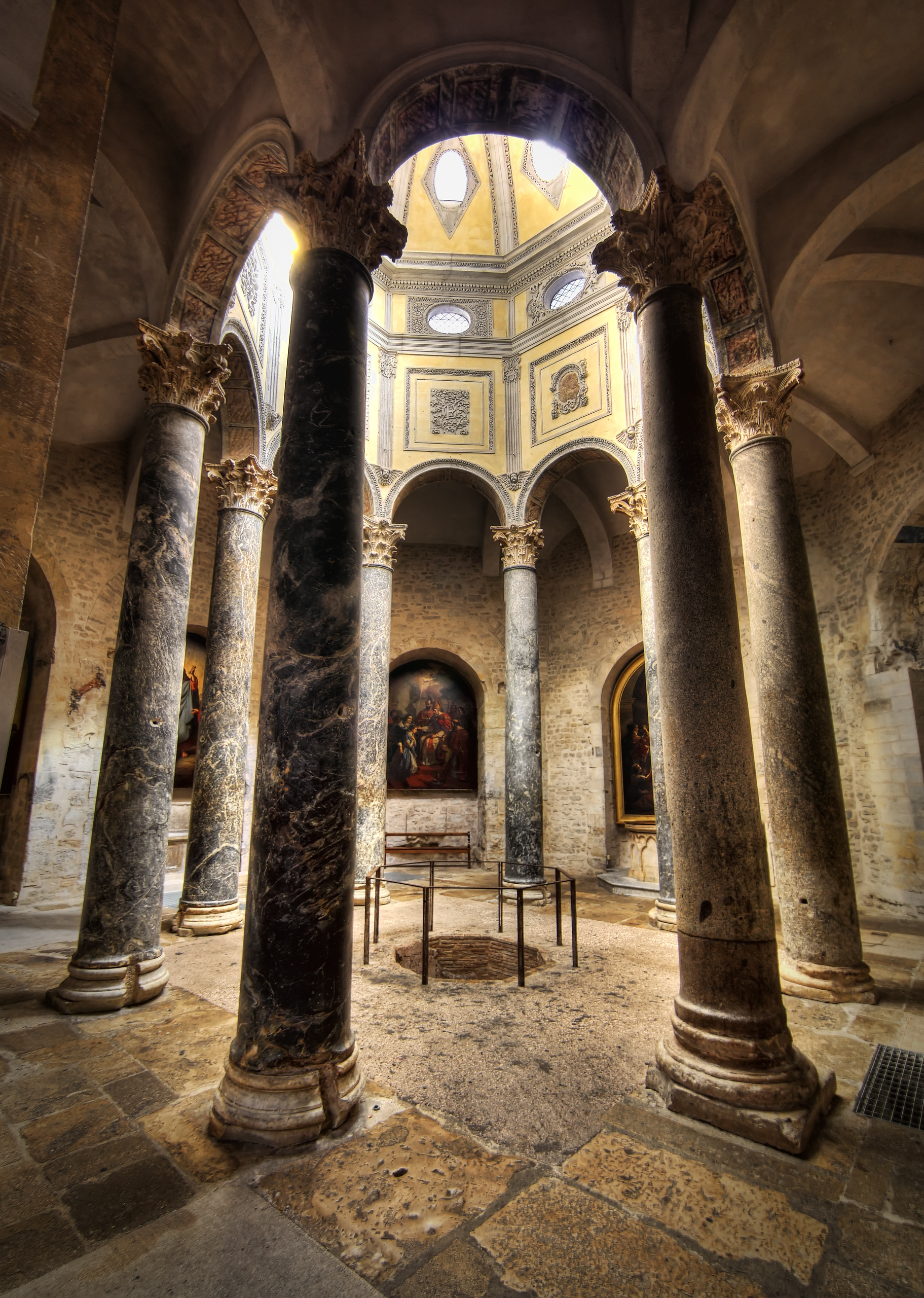
Baptistery of Aix Cathedral (6th century). The columns are probably from a Roman temple that stood on the same site.

The baptistery was built at the beginning of the 6th century, at about the same time as similar baptisteries in Fréjus Cathedral and Riez Cathedral in Provence, in Albenga in Liguria, and in Djémila, Algeria. Only the octagonal baptismal pool and the lower part of the walls remain from that period. The other walls and the dome were rebuilt in the Renaissance. A viewing hole in the floor reveals the bases of the porticoes of the Roman forum under the baptistery.

=== Cloister ===
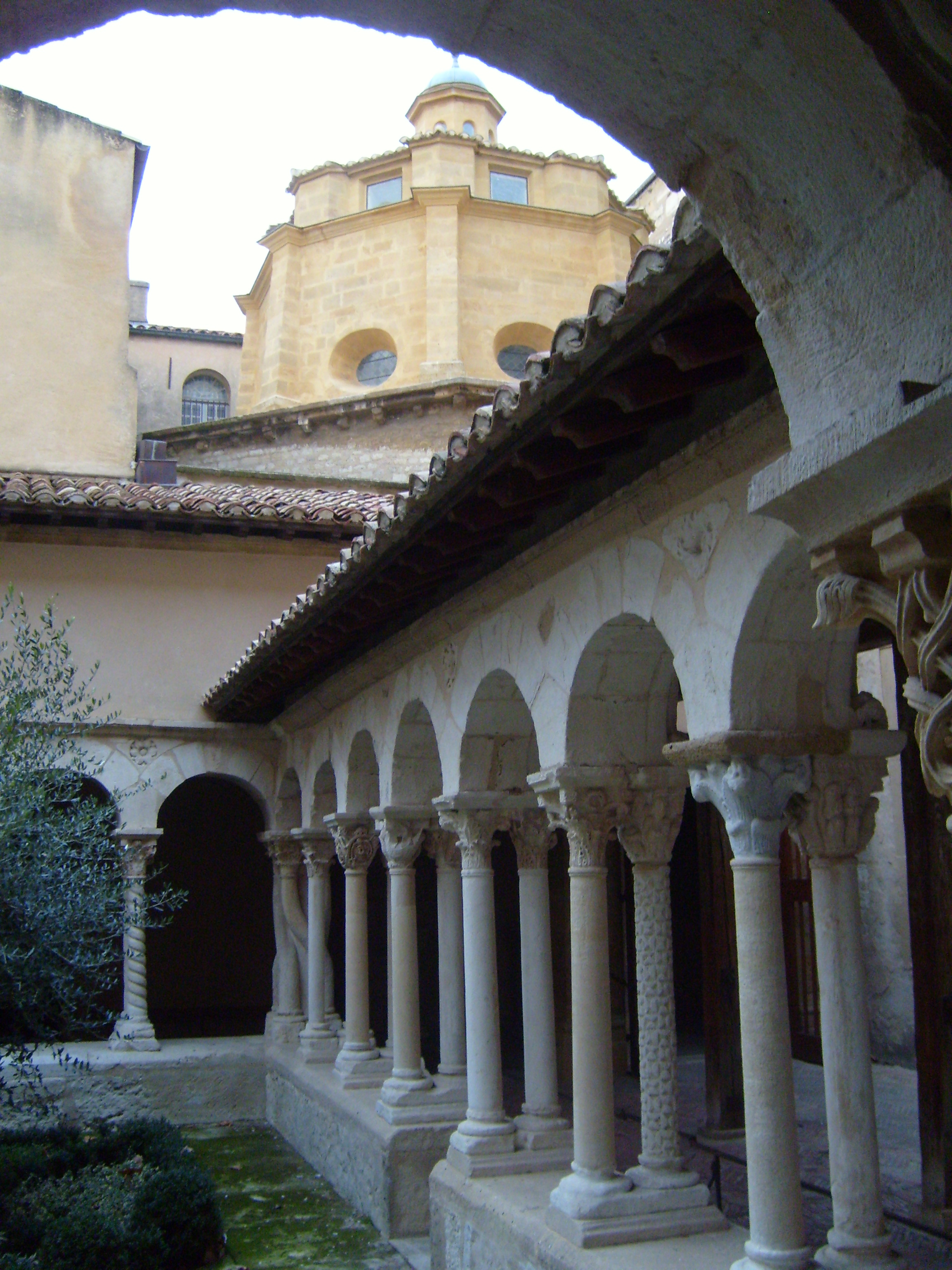
Baptistery seen from the Cloister

The cloister was used by the canons, the priests who served the bishop and administered the church's property. It was built at the end of the 12th century, at a time when canons were urged to live a more austere and more monastic communal life.

The cloister was built upon the old Roman square, dating from the 1st century AD. The galleries were timbered and not vaulted, so the pairs of columns in the arcades that support them are slender and graceful.

The four columns at the angles of the cloister are decorated with carvings of the symbols of the four evangelists: an angel for St. Matthew; a lion for St. Mark; a bull for St. Luke; and an eagle for St. John.

The capitals of the columns on the west and north are decorated with scenes from the New Testament and Old Testament, and with a statue of St. Peter. A marble slab in the west gallery, whose inscription has worn away, may be the tomb of Basilius, bishop of Aix in 500, and the builder of the first cathedral.

=== Organ ===
A small organ was placed sideways on a tribune in the canonical choir above the stalls in about 1513. It was built by Brother Pierre Perrini, with a chest by Jean Guiramand, and shutters painted by Jean de Troyes. In 1612 a larger organ by organ-builder Pierre Marchand was placed opposite the small organ. In 1750, this organ was replaced by the present "green and gold organ," built between 1743 and 1746 by Brother Jean-Esprit Isnard, a Dominican from the convent of Tarascon, who built several other notable organs in Provence, including that in the basilica of Saint-Maximin. For the sake of symmetry, an identical but false organ chest was built on the opposite side, where the small organ had been. A new organ was reconstructed inside the original chest in 1855, and reconditioned in 1867 and 1983.

=== Neo-Gothic decoration ===
Painted and sculpted neo-Gothic decoration was added to the nave between 1857 and 1862. The work was done by Revoil, the architect of the diocese, who was in contact with Viollet-le-Duc and his partners on the restoration of the Sainte Chapelle in Paris that was taking place about the same time. Other 19th century decoration included a high altar with two angels of gilded wood, made in the Empire style (1805).

== Works of art in the cathedral ==
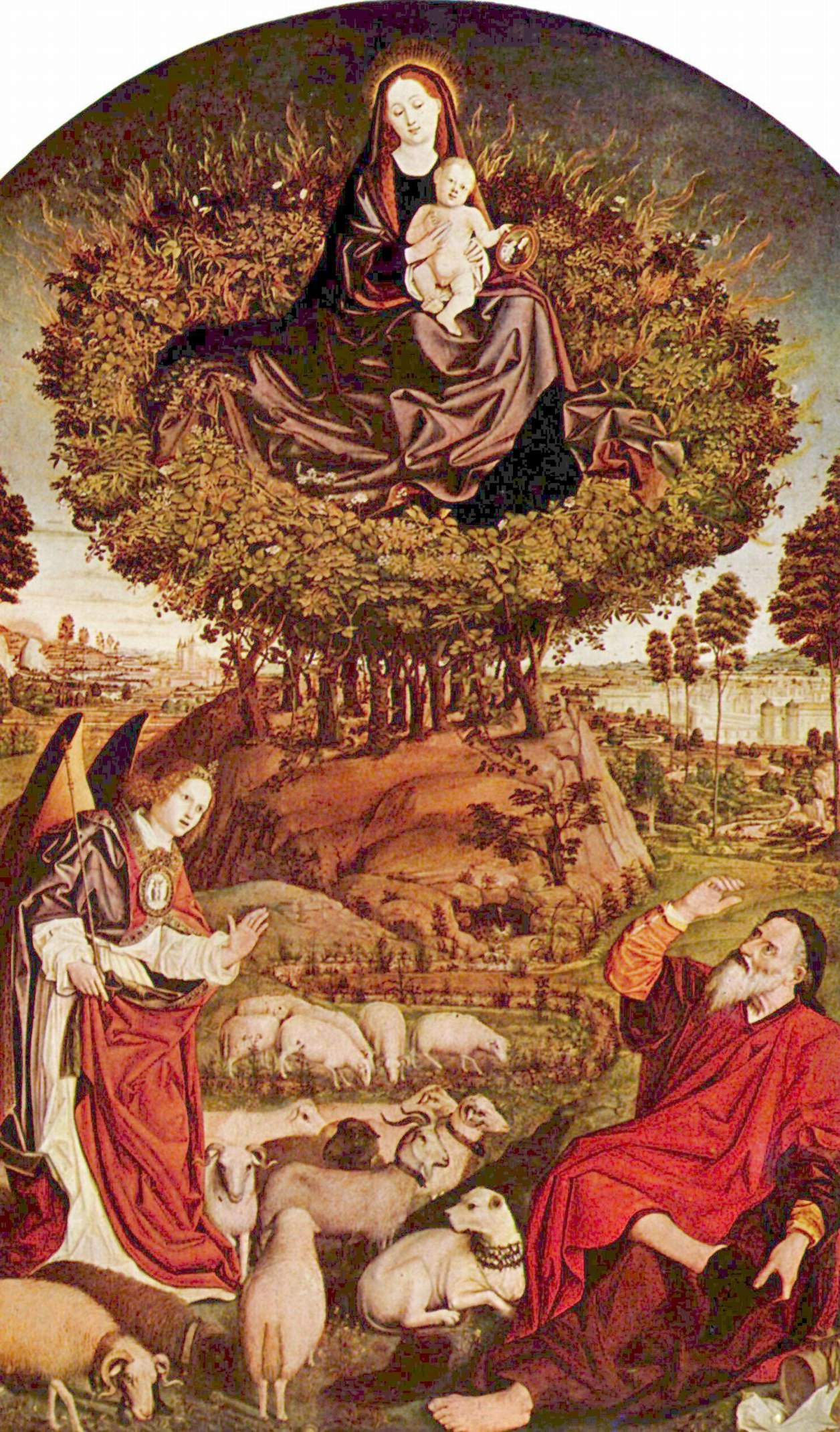
Triptych of the Burning Bush, by Nicolas Froment

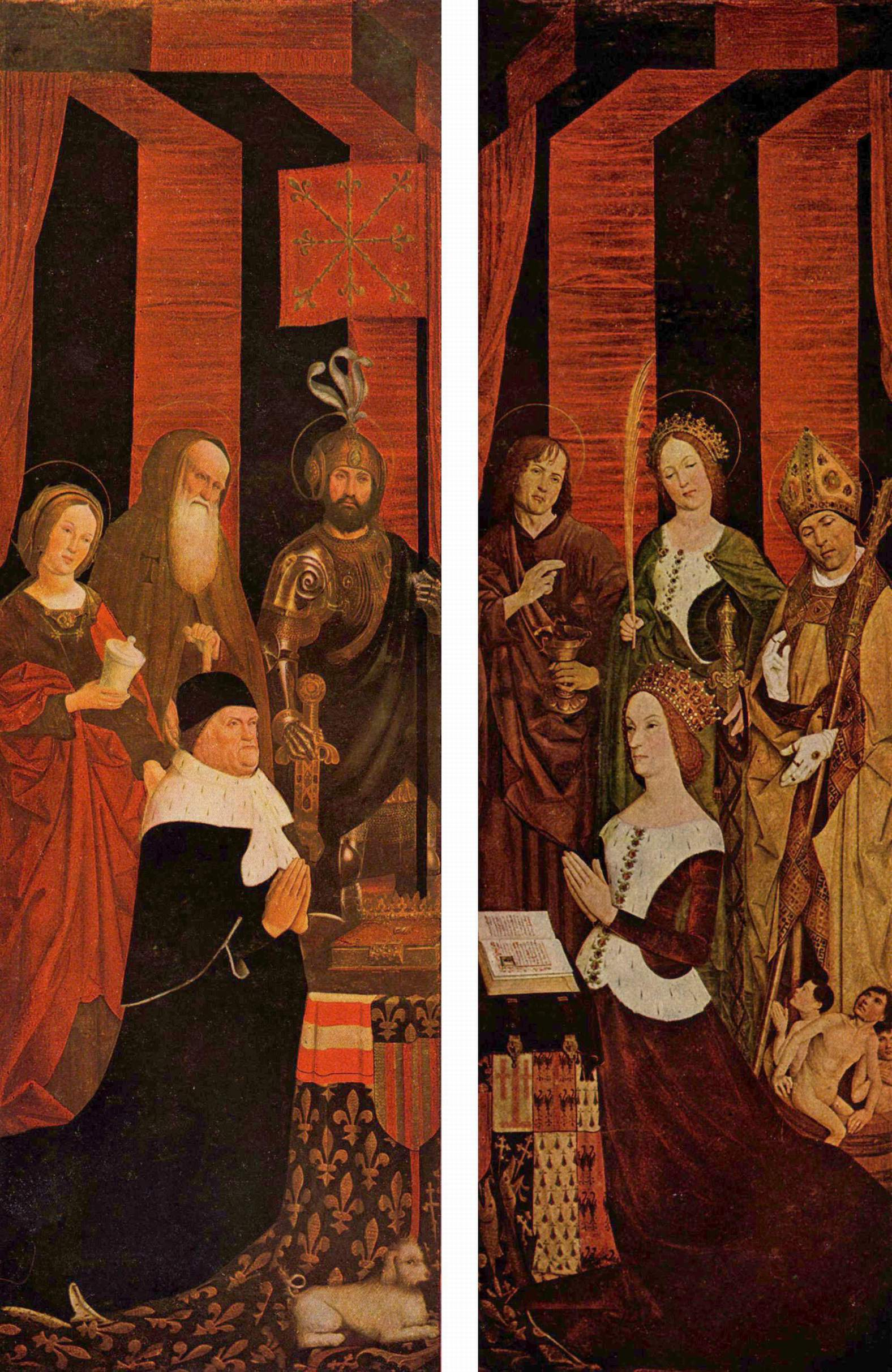
Side panels of the triptych: King René (left) and Queen Jeanne (right)

The most notable artwork in the cathedral is the Burning Bush Triptych by Nicolas Froment. Others include:

- Christ on the Cross with the Virgin of Sorrows, Saint Peter and Saint Antoine, (1640), by Jean Daret (père), in the Chapel of the Sacred Heart;
- The Last Supper, (1668) by Jean Daret (fils), in the south section of the transept;
- The Incredulity of St. Thomas, by the Flemish painter Louis Finson (1613) in the lower part of the Gothic nave;
- A set of seventeen tapestries of the life of Christ, bought in 1656 by the chapter thanks to a legacy from Archbishop Michel Mazarin. The tapestries were among twenty-six originally woven in 1511 for Canterbury Cathedral in England, and decorated the choir there until 1642, when they were taken down during the English Civil War. They made their way to Paris, where they were bought by the chapter and placed in the choir of the cathedral. The tapestries were stolen during the French Revolution, but repurchased by the Archbishop of Aix-en-Provence and Arles. In 1977, the first nine tapestries were stolen, and have not been recovered.

=== Altar of the Aygosi family ===
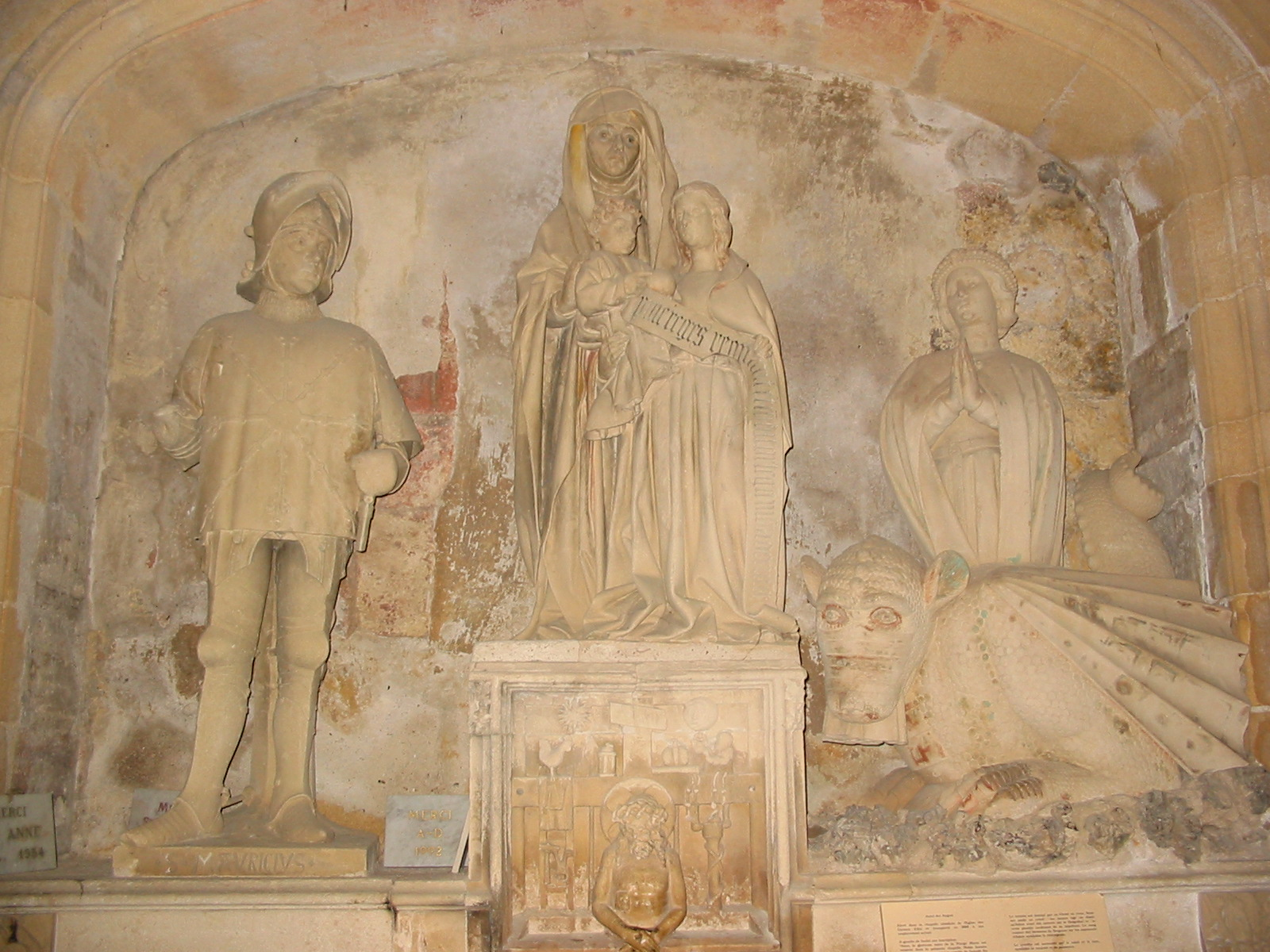
The altar of the Aygosi family

This stone altar, originally installed in the church of the Carmelites in Aix, was placed in the cathedral in 1823. On the left side is the inscription: "Anne, la glorieuse mère de la Vierge Marie, est vénérée dans la présente chapelle. Noble homme Urbain Aygosi a exposé içi le comble de l'amour. En la présente année du Seigneur 1470, la chapelle est achevée par la grâce de Dieu, le 28 janvier." ("Anne, the glorious mother of the Virgin Mary, is venerated in this chapel. The nobleman Urbain Aygosi shows here the highest love. In the year of Our Lord 1470, the chapel is finished, by the grace of God, on January 28.")

This monument comprises:

- an altar surmounted by a false tabernacle, with, at its edge, the coat of arms of Urbain Aygosi (or Aygosy);
- a tabernacle decorated with a figure of Christ with the inscription "Look, mortal, it is for you that such a victim is delivered";
- a retable of stone with six figures: Saint Anne with the Virgin Mary, holding the infant Jesus; Saint Maurice in a coat of armour of the 15th century; St. Margaret of Antioch with a dragon; and Christ on the Cross. Statues of the Virgin and of St. John, also once part of this altar, are on display at the Musée Granet. The sculptor of the altar, Audinet Stéphani, was originally from Cambrai, and worked in Aix and its region between 1446 and 1476.

== Aix Cathedral in fiction ==
- Aix Cathedral features prominently in the urban fantasy novel Ysabel by fantasy author Guy Gavriel Kay.
- Aix Cathedral appeared in the Marvel TV show, Loki.

Aix Cathedral plays a significant role in Émile Zola's novel, La Conquete de Plassans (1874), where it is referred to as Saint-Saturnin.
