= Saint Mitre =

Catholic saint

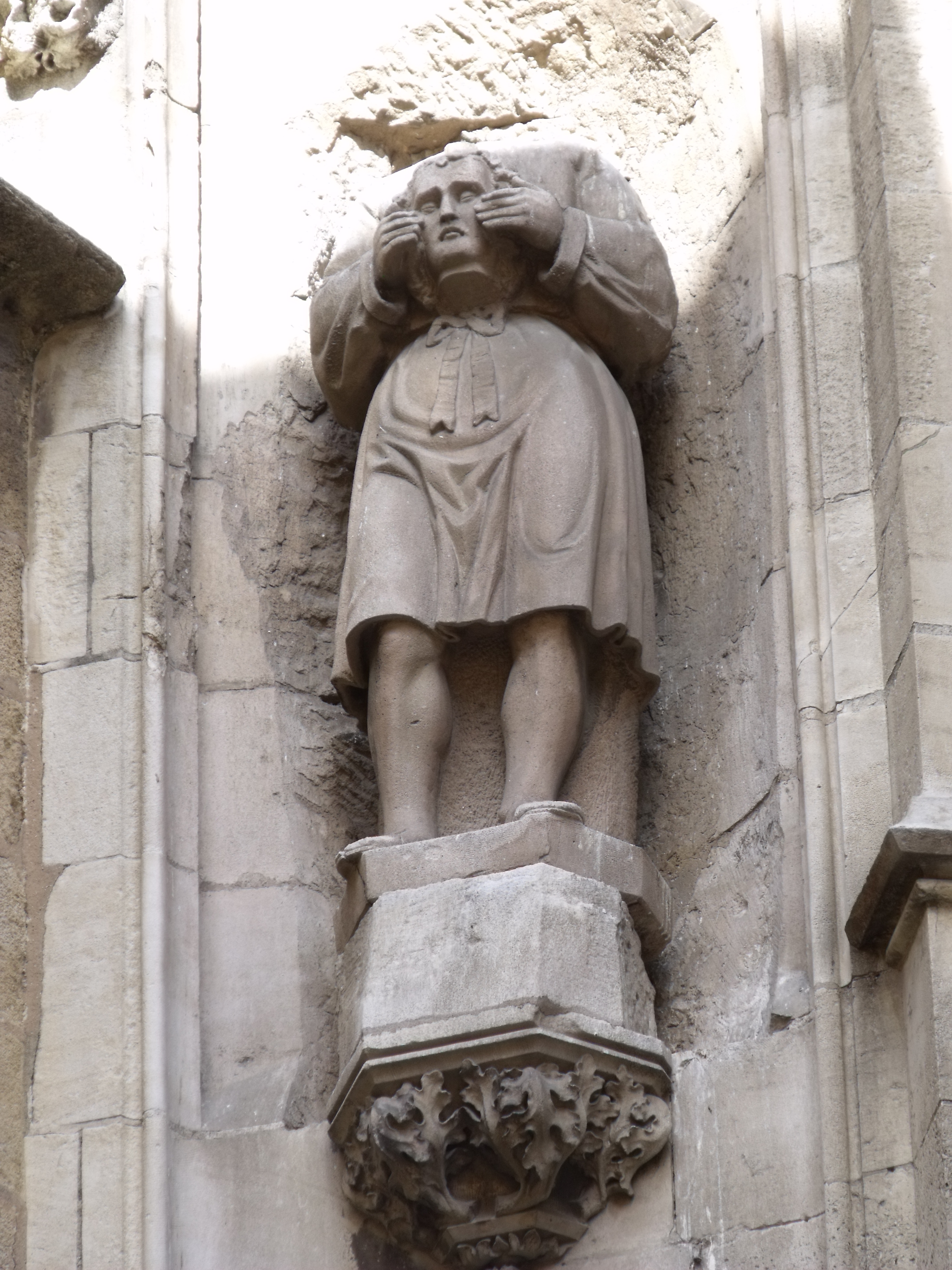
Mitre at Aix Cathedral

Mitre (433–466) was a Catholic saint, who was born in Thessaloniki, Greece, and died in Aix-en-Provence.

== Biography ==
According to the legend, Mitre, a field worker living in Aix-en-Provence with Arvendus, was charged with witchcraft for making a miracle come true. He was beheaded. He then picked up his head and took it to a church in Aix, Église Notre-Dame de la Seds.

On 23 October 1383, his relics were moved to the Cathédrale Saint-Sauveur in Aix-en-Provence. It is said that the right-hand column holding his tombstone had a shining hole in it, giving out a liquid good for curing eye sores.

== Influence ==
- A chapel named after Saint-Mitre was built in Aix-en-Provence in the 17th century.
- The Cathédrale Saint-Sauveur holds a painting by Nicolas Froment, Légende de saint Mitre, dating back to 1470–1475.
- Saint-Mitre-les-Remparts was named after him.
- Aix-raised Émile Zola mentions Saint Mitre in the first chapter of La Fortune des Rougon.

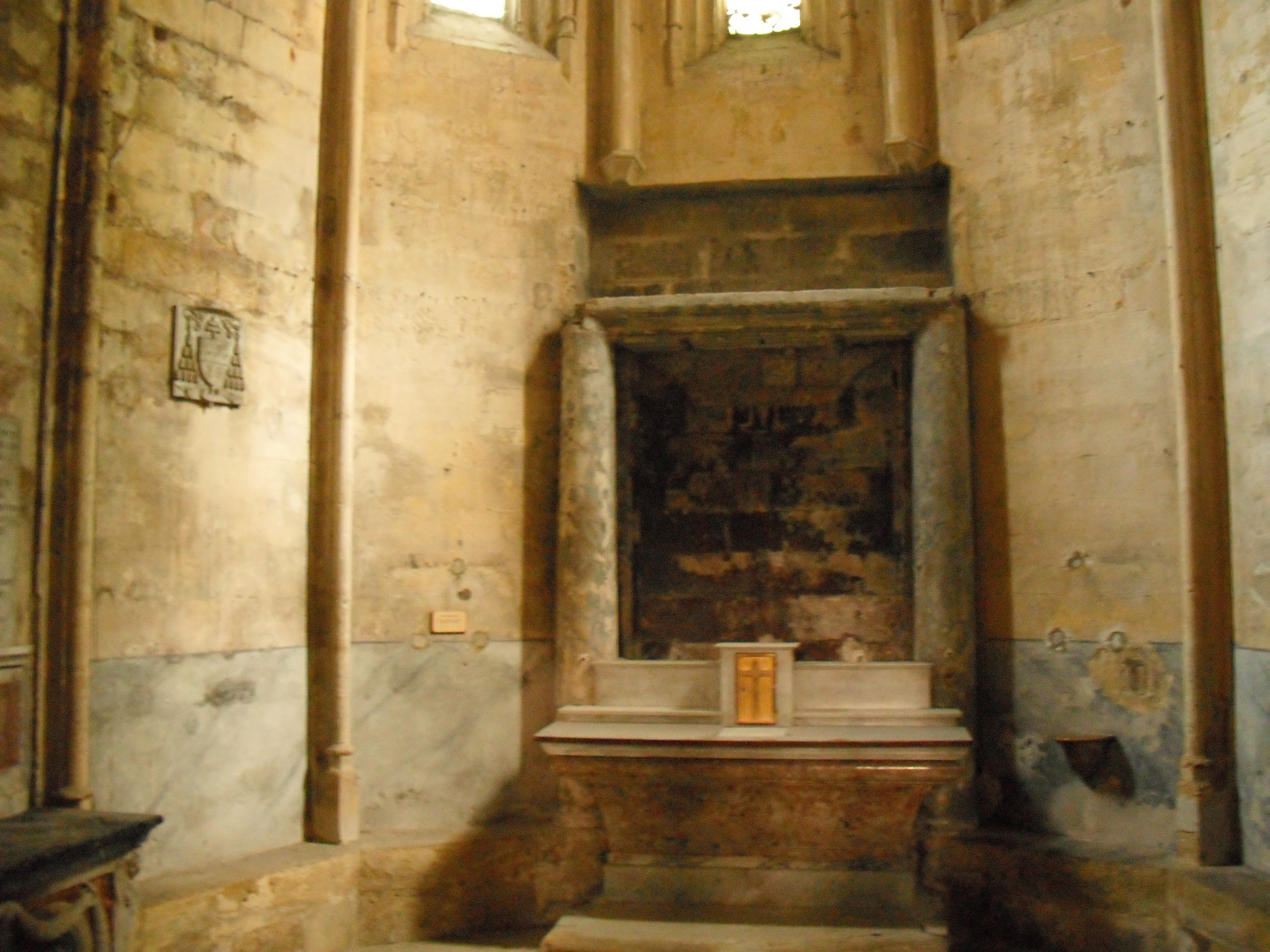
Chapel St Mitre in Aix Cathedral.

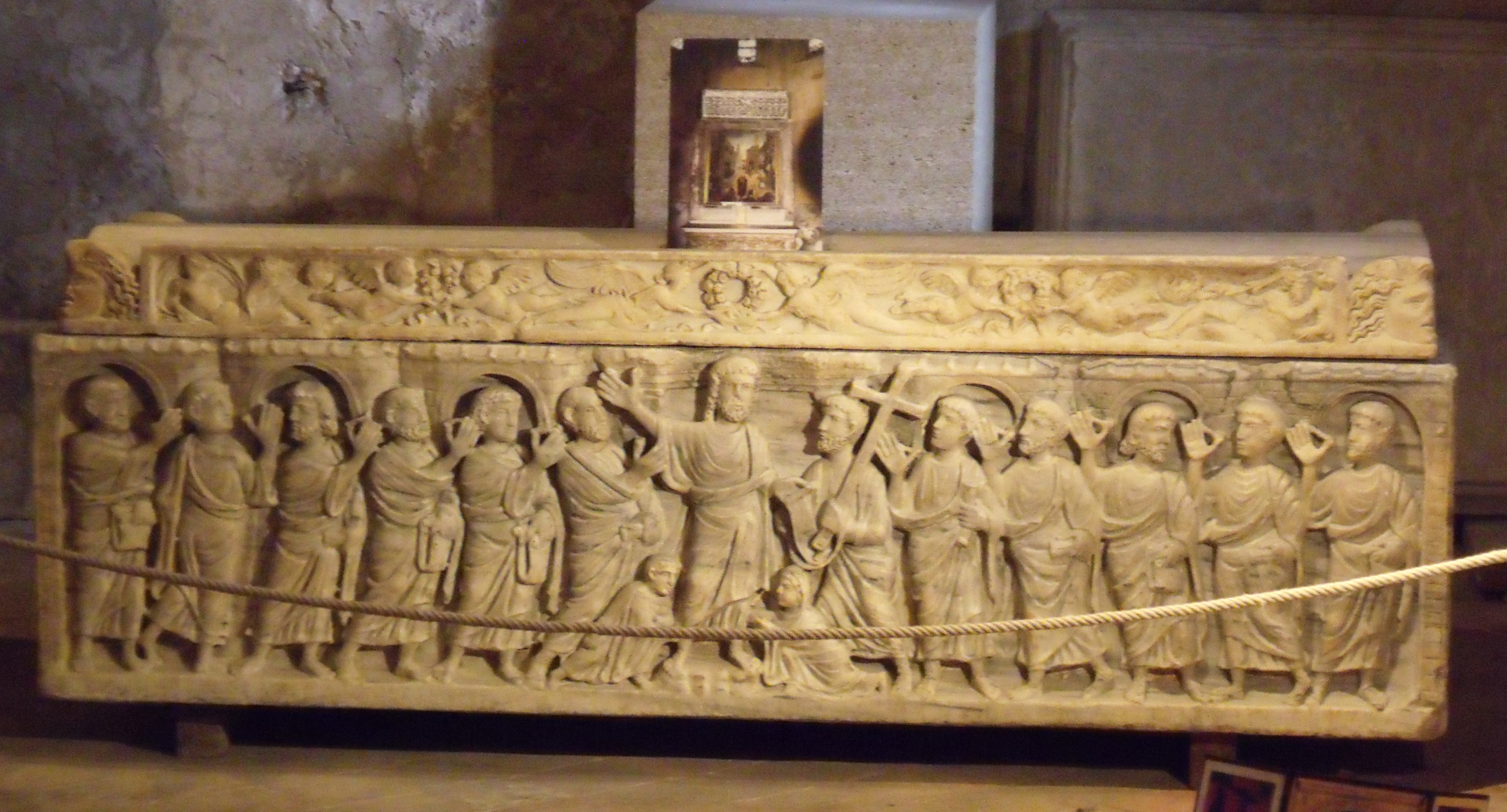
