= Carmel de la Place Maubert =

House in Paris, France

Coordinates: 48.8492°N 2.3503°E

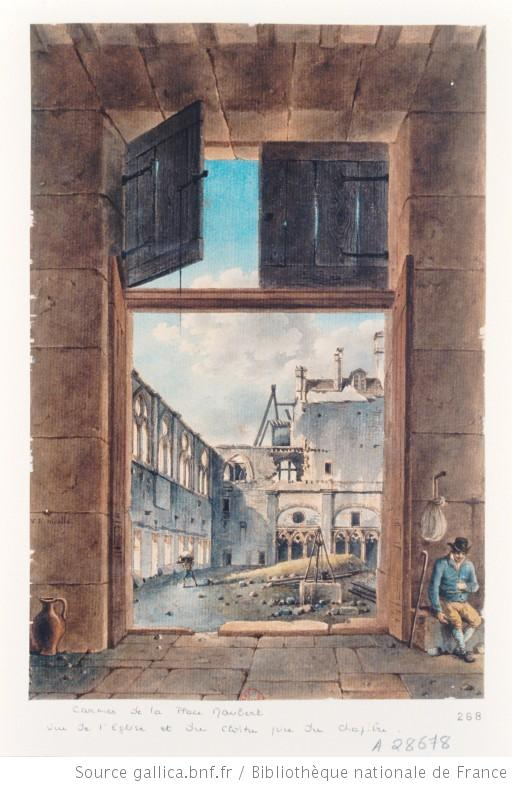
Chapter of the Carmelite convent on Place Maubert, Rue Basse-des-Carmes, Paris. Pen and brown ink wash drawing.

The Carmel de la Place Maubert (French pronunciation: [kaʁmɛl də la plas mobɛʁ]), also known as the Grand Couvent or Couvent des Barrés (Latin: Monasterium de Mariae de Monte-Carmelo), was a house of the Calced Carmelites located on Place Maubert on a site now occupied by the police station for the 5th arrondissement below the Rue de la Montagne-Sainte-Geneviève, Paris.

== Bibliography ==
- Chronique dite de Jean de Venette (ed. and transl. Colette Beaune), LGF. Paris, 2011: "Ce chroniqueur français du XIVe siècle, prieur du couvent du Carmel, place Maubert, a légué des chroniques sur la vie de Paris de 1340 à 1368, témoignant notamment de la Grande Peste de 1348".
- Epitaphier du Vieux-Paris
- Joyaux et Pierreries donnés par Jeanne d'Évreux aux Carmes: Archives de l'art français: document collection
- Les Grands Carmes de Paris in Abbayes, monastères et couvents de Paris, Paul and Marie-Louise Biver
- Histoire de la ville et de tout le diocèse de Paris (volume 2), Jean Lebeuf
- Aubin-Louis Millin, Antiquités nationales, 1792, pp. 1-48
