= Nicolas Froment =

French painter

- Born: c. 1435; Uzès, Languedoc, Kingdom of France
- Died: c. 1486; Avignon, France

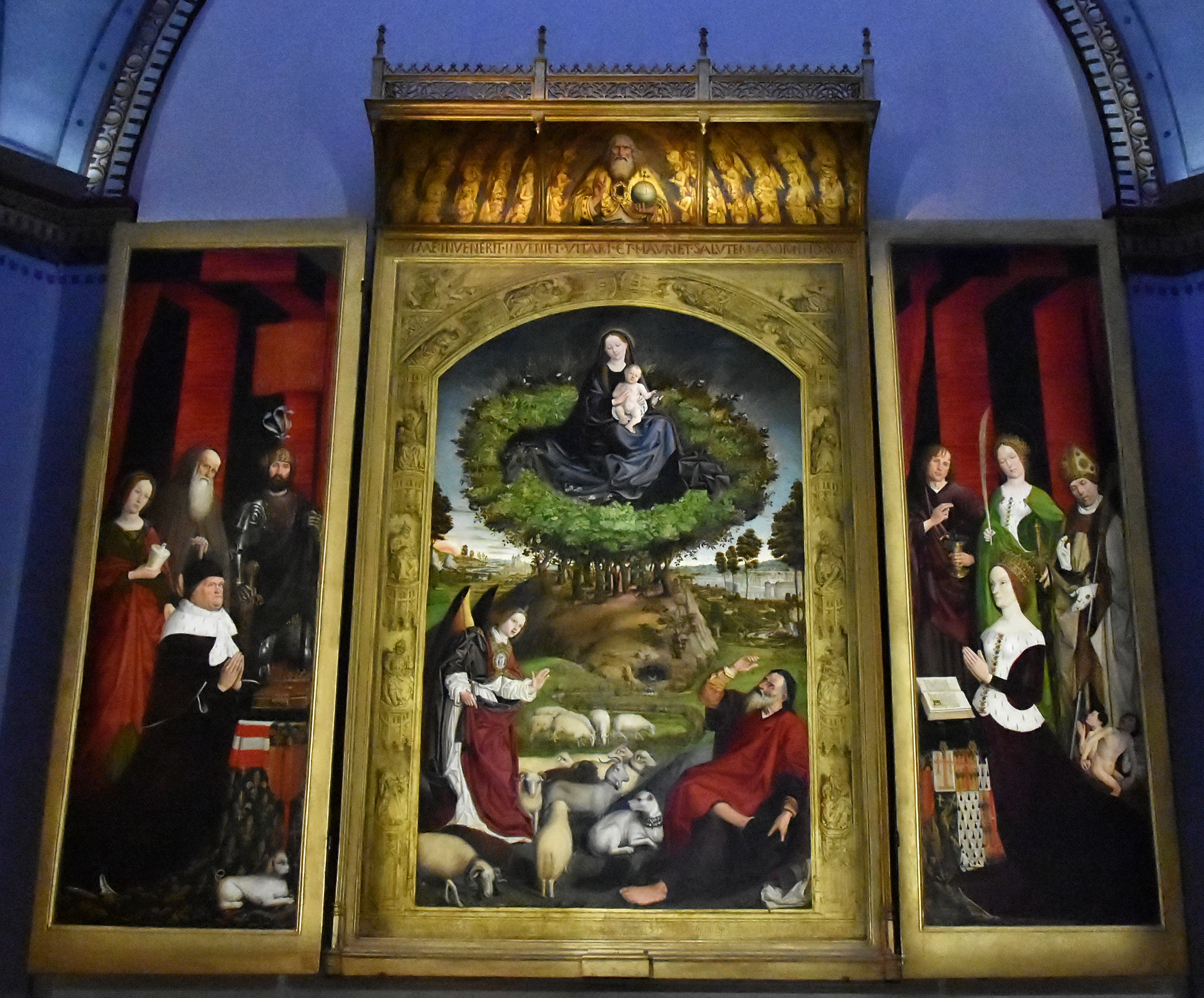
Triptych of the Burning Bush, by Nicolas Froment, in Aix Cathedral

Nicolas Froment (c. 1435 – c. 1486) was a French painter of the Early Renaissance. Froment is one of the most notable representatives of the Second School of Avignon (École d'Avignon), a group of artists at the court of the Popes in Avignon, who were located there from 1309 to 1411.

He was influenced by the Flemish style that characterizes the last phase of the Gothic.

He undertook to paint an altarpiece 12 February 1470 in Aix for a rich widow called Catherine Spifami; in the center of the panel is a depicting the Death of Mary, and on the side panels, the Saints Mary Magdalene and Catherine are shown. He was attributed a number of works from this timetime, but none of these attributions can be considered reliable.

One of the most interesting work of this group is the Retable des Pérussis or The Pérussis Altarpiece, depicts the adoration of the empty cross on Golgatha, and is located at the Metropolitan Museum in New York.

== Works ==
- The Resurrection of Lazarus, triptych, (1461), Florence, Galleria degli Uffizi.
- The Matheron Diptych, (v.1475), oil on canvas, 17 x 26 cm, Paris, Musée du Louvre.
- Le Buisson ardent, triptych, (1475-1476), tempera on wood, 410 x 305 cm, Aix-en-Provence, cathédrale Saint-Sauveur.
- The Legend of Saint Mitre, (about 1470), oil on wood, Aix-en-Provence, cathédrale Saint-Sauveur.
Selected works

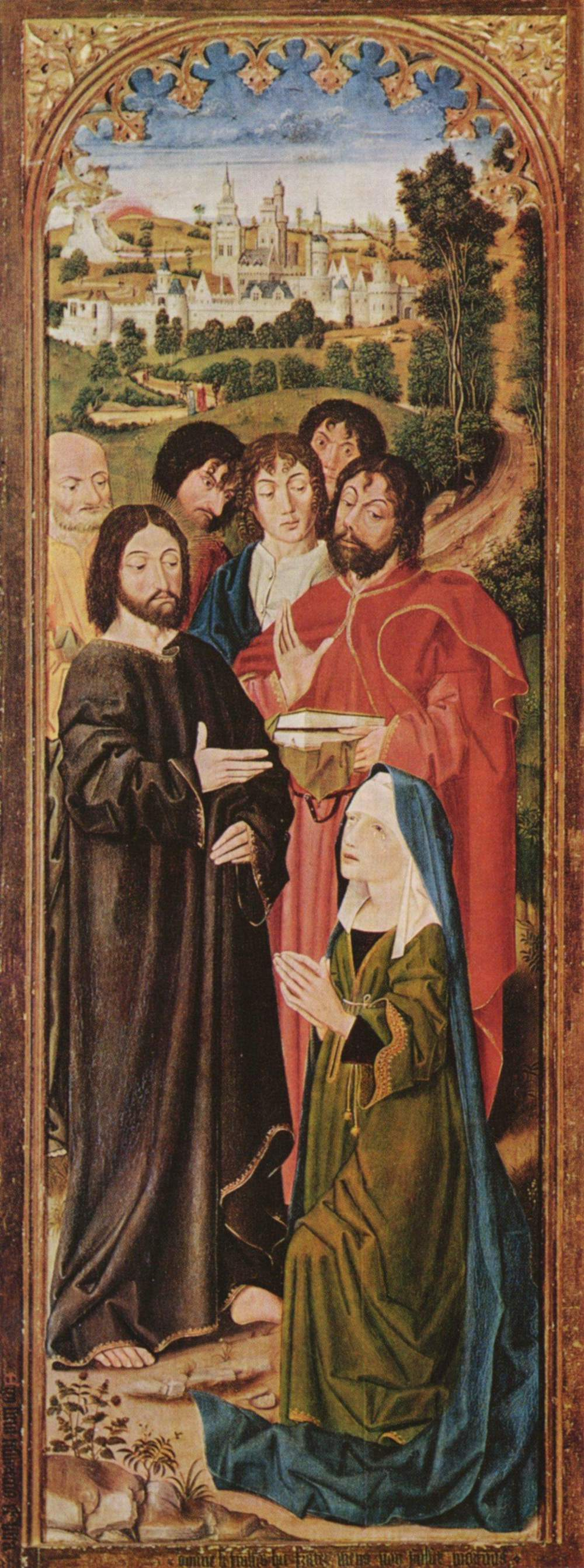
Christ and Saint Martha
Left panel of The Resurrection of Lazarus

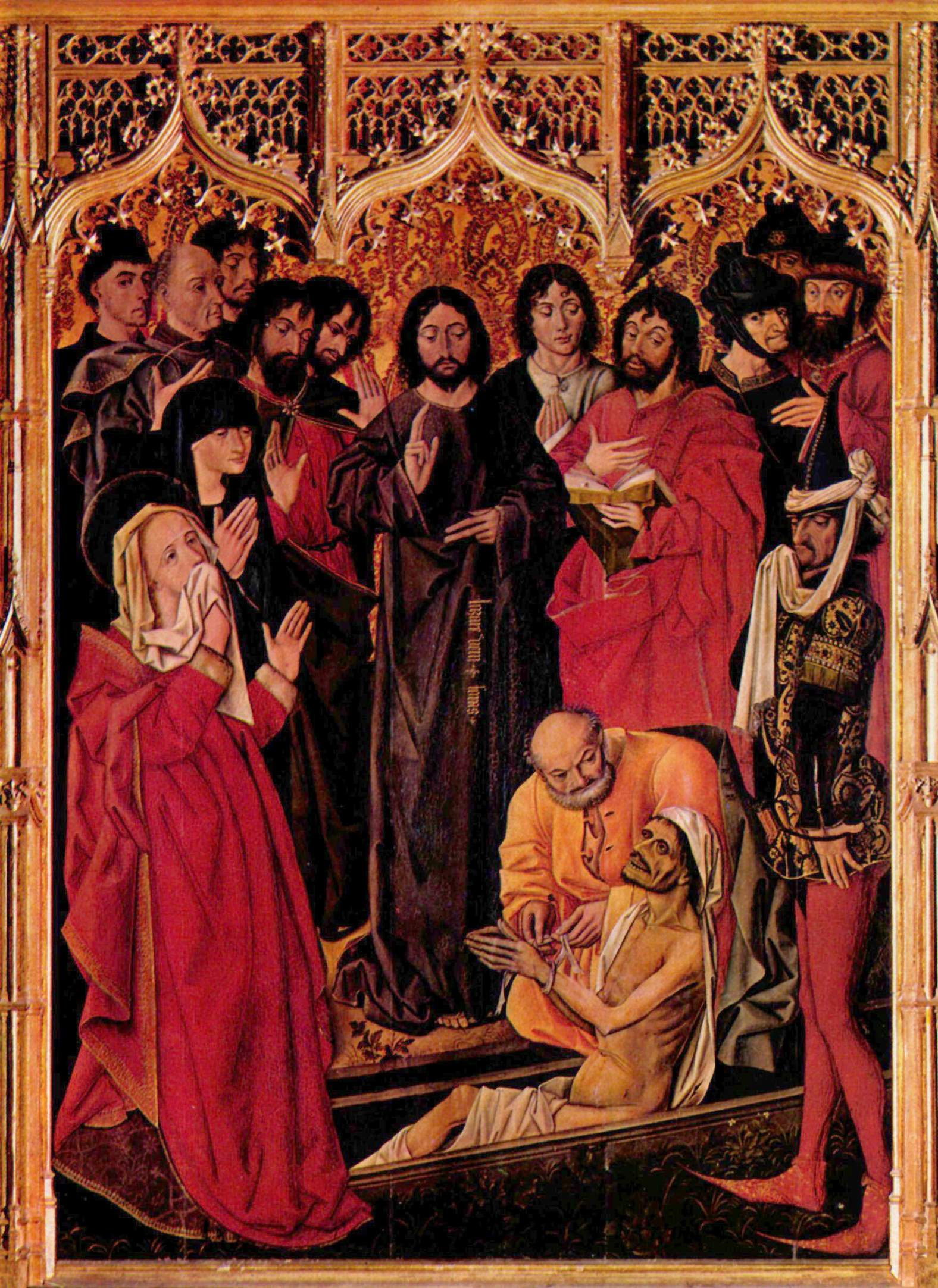
Central panel of the triptych The Resurrection of Lazarus

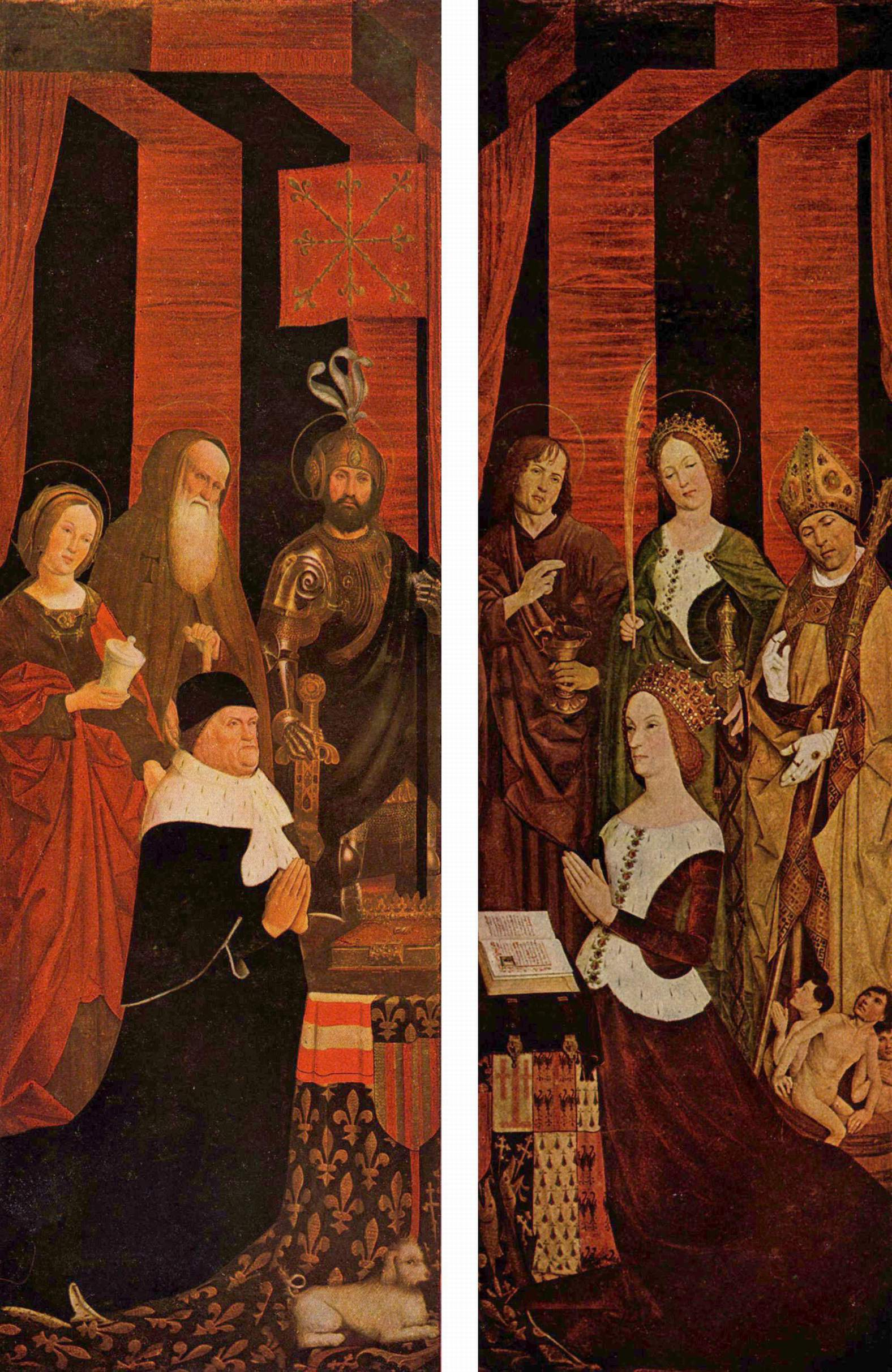
Lateral panels of the triptych The Burning Bush

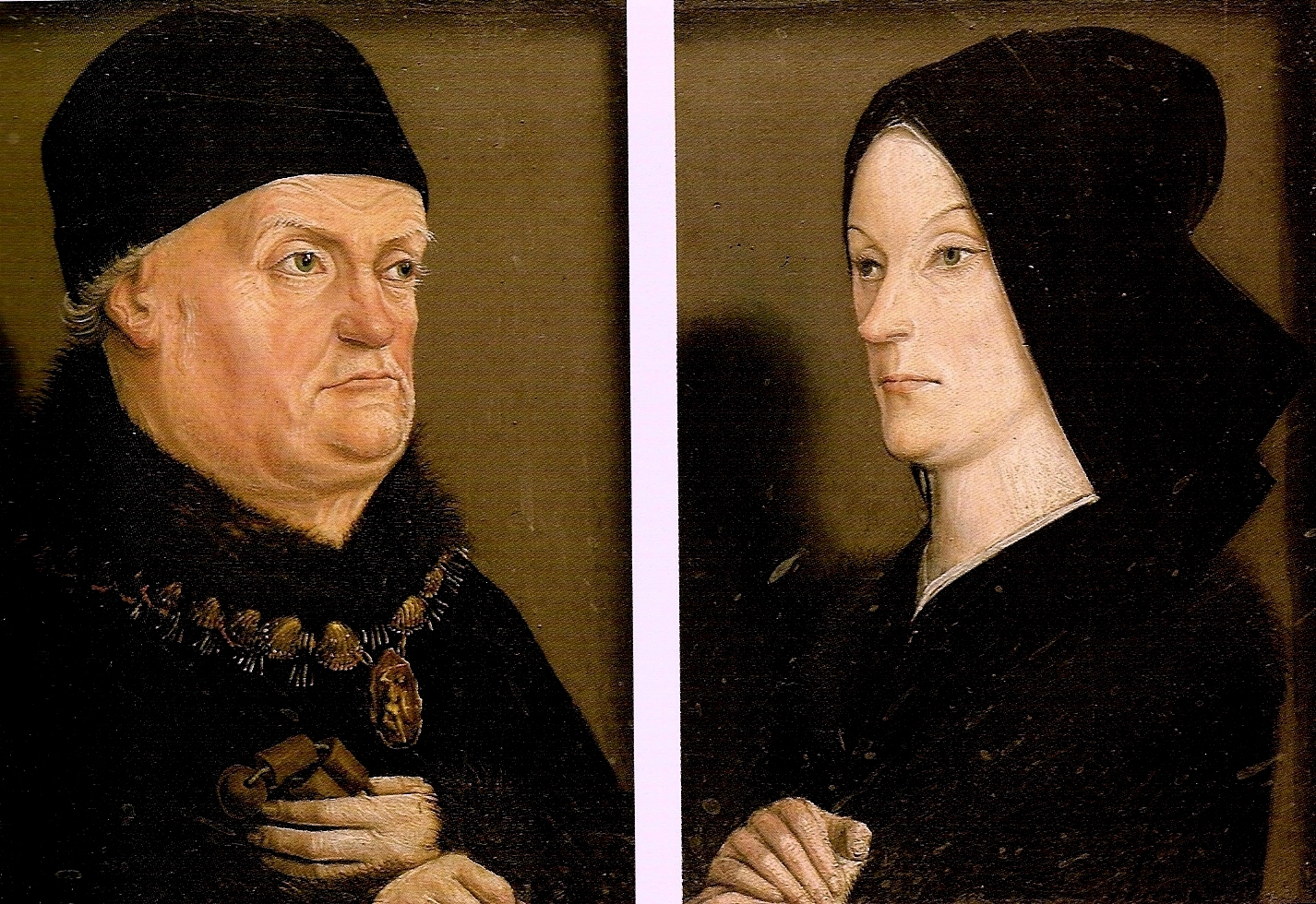
The Matheron diptych

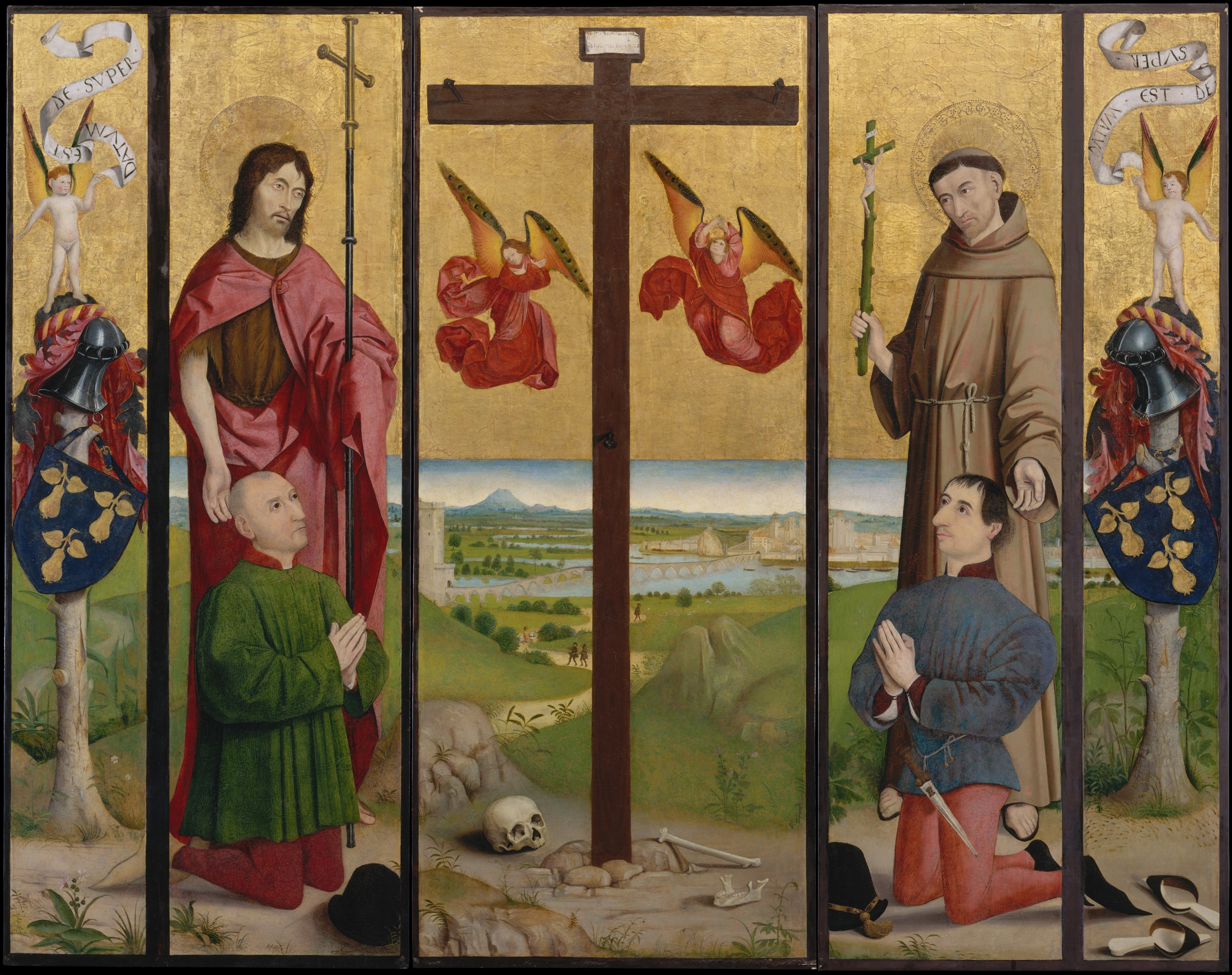
Circle of Nicolas Froment, The Pérussis Altarpiece, The Metropolitan Museum of Art

== See also ==
- Early Renaissance painting
