= Jean Daret =

French painter

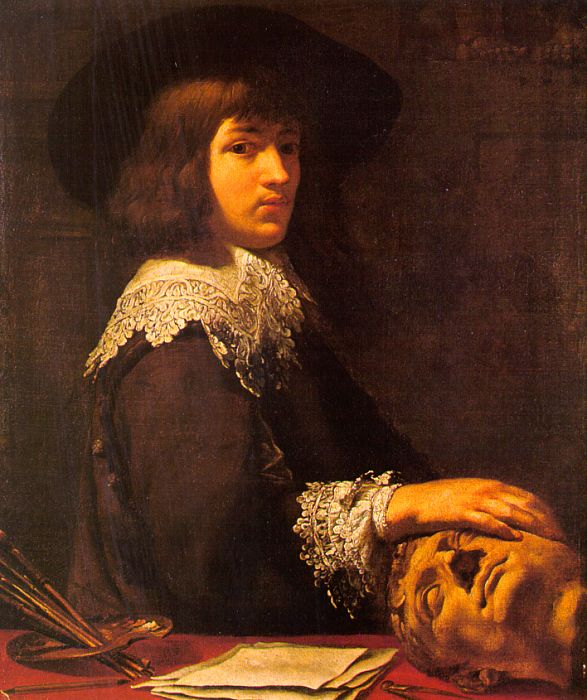
- Self-portrait (1636; Hermitage, St. Petersburg)
- Born: 1613; Brussels, Spanish Netherlands
- Died: 1668 (aged 54–55); Aix-en-Provence, France
- Occupation: Painter

Jean Daret (1613–1668) was a Flemish artist.

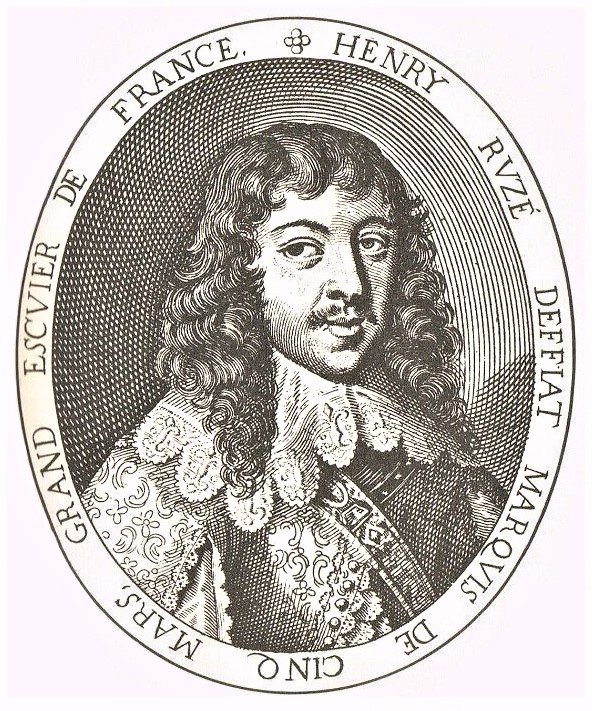
Jean Daret, Henri Coiffier de Ruzé, Marquis de Cinq-Mars, ca. 1642

== Biography ==
Jean Daret was born in Brussels in 1613.

He was appointed an official painter for King Louis XIV. He specialised in decorating mansions, namely Chateau de Chateaurenard, at Rue Gaston Saporta, in Aix-en-Provence.

He died in Aix-en-Provence at age 55.

=== Legacy ===
- Rue [street] Jean Daret in Aix-en-Provence is named after him.
