= Saint Catherine, Egypt =

City in Sinai

Saint Catherine سانت كاترين Saint Katrine
- Town
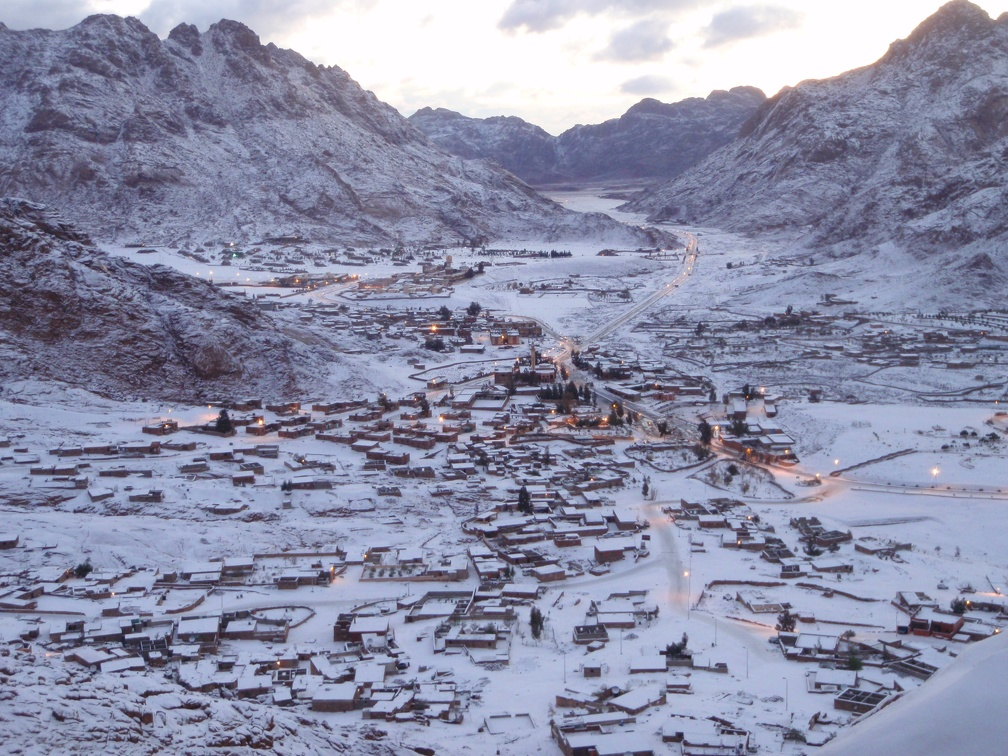
- Saint Catherine downtown on a snowy day
- Nicknames: White Catherine, Egypt's White Roof
- Location in Egypt
- Coordinates: 28°33′N 33°56′E
- Country: Egypt
- Governorate: South Sinai

Area
  - Total: 2,271 sq mi (5,883 km^{2})
- Elevation: 5,203 ft (1,586 m)

Population (2021)
  - Total: 4,792
  - Density: 2.110/sq mi (0.8146/km^{2})
  - Ethnicities: Jebeliya Bedouins Egyptians Greeks and Russians
- Time zone: UTC+2 (EET)
  - Summer (DST): UTC+3 (EEST)

Saint Catherine (Egyptian Arabic: سانت كاترين, pronounced [ˈsænte kætˈɾiːn]; also spelled Saint Katrine) is a town located in the South Sinai Governorate of Egypt, situated at the foot of Mount Sinai. The city is the site of Saint Catherine's Monastery.

The city is 1,586 metres (5,203 ft) above sea level and is 120 kilometres (75 mi) from Nuweiba. In 1994, its population was 4,603 people. In 2002, the Saint Catherine area was declared a UNESCO World Heritage Site.

== History ==
During Egypt’s Pharaonic Era (3200-323 BCE), although Saint Catherine was not yet established as a city, the area was part of the Egyptian Empire in the province of "Deshret Reithu."

In the 16th century BCE, the Egyptian pharaohs built the way of Shur across Sinai to Beersheba and on to Jerusalem. The region provided the Egyptian Empire with turquoise, gold, and copper. Well-preserved ruins of mines and temples are found not far from Saint Catherine at Serabit el-Khadim and Wadi Mukattab, the Valley of Inscription. They include temples from the 12th Dynasty, dedicated to Hathor, goddess of love, music, and beauty, and from the New Kingdom dedicated to Sopdu, the god of the Eastern Desert.

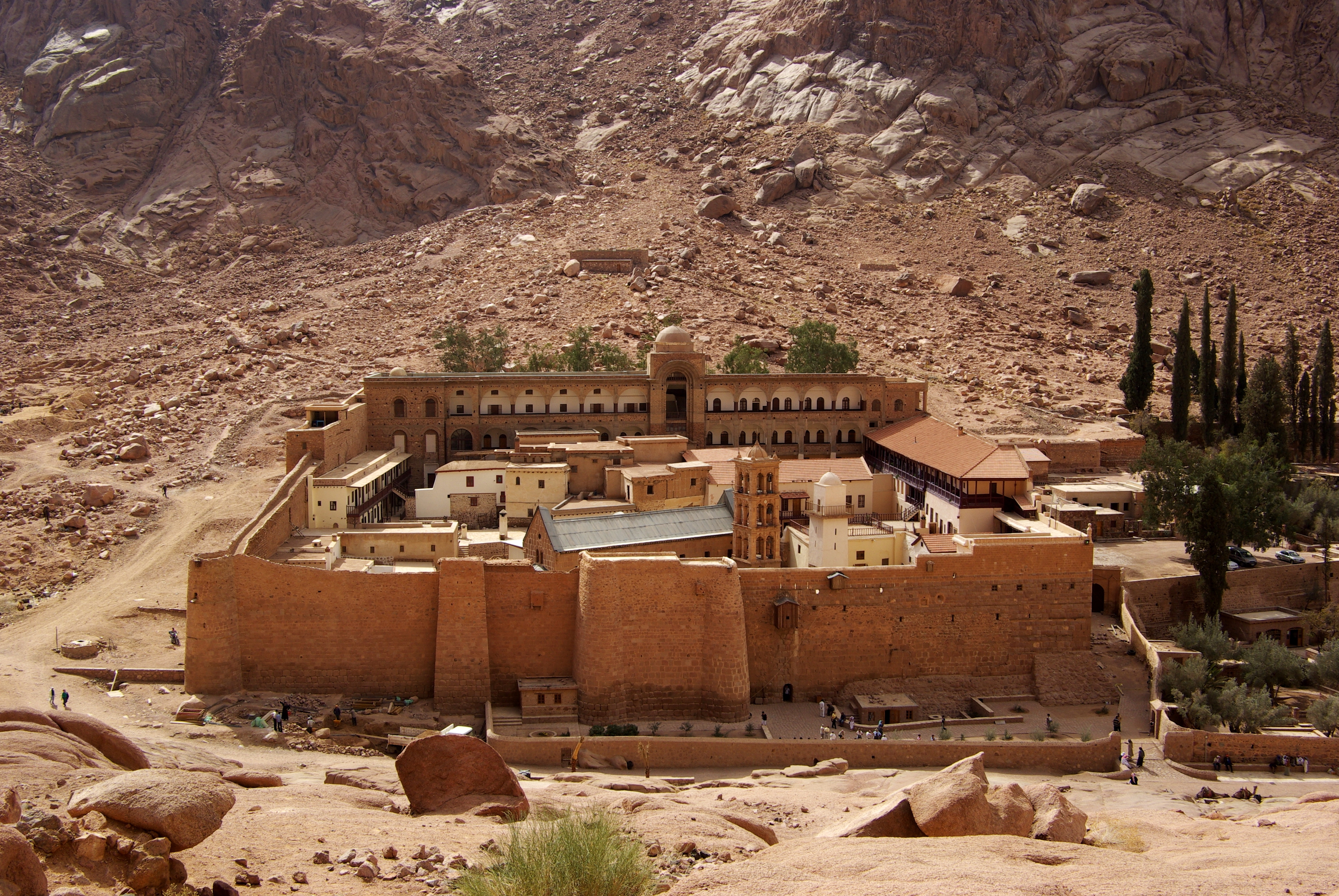
Saint Catherine's Monastery

Saint Catherine’s City was established between 527 and 565 CE, when Saint Catherine's Monastery was constructed at the foot of Mount Sinai by the order of Emperor Justinian.

== Modern township and tourist attractions ==
Today, Saint Catherine City is organized as a township. It has a high school, a hospital, a police and fire brigade, hotels, a post office, a telephone center, and a bank.

The township's oldest settlement was in Wadi El Sybaiya, east of the city's monastery, where descendants of Roman soldiers, the Jebeliya, were accommodated. It started growing into a town after the tarmac road was completed in the 1980s and the tourist trade began. Many of the nomadic Bedouins moved to small settlements around the city's monastery, which collectively make up Saint Catherine Town. The districts of El Milga, Shamiya, Raha, and Nabi Harun form the core of the town, at the end of the tarmac road where the valleys of Wadi El Arbain (Wadi El Lega), Wadi Quez, Wadi Raha, Wadi Shrayj and Wadi El Dier connect to the main valley, Wadi Sheikh. There are settlements in Wadi Sheikh that date before the town and other smaller settlements in the valleys. Saint Catherine is the capital of the Municipality of Saint Katherine, which includes these outlying areas.

== Geography ==
Köppen-Geiger climate classification system classifies the climate as desert (BWh). Saint Catherine has the coldest nights of any city in Egypt, and its humidity is very low. The highest mountain ranges in Egypt surround the town, with many smaller valleys leading from the basin to the mountains in all directions. The township is at an elevation of 1,600 metres (5,200 ft). The high altitude of the town and the high mountain ranges which surround it provide a pleasant climate with mild summer nights and relatively cool winter days. The nights can get very cold on rare occasions, making it sometimes necessary to heat buildings and public places. Saint Catherine is considered to be one of the coldest towns in Egypt along with Nekhel and other locales in mountainous Sinai. Saint Catherine receives infrequent snowfalls during December, January, and February, however, snow has also occurred in late autumn and early spring.

Saint Catherine Town lies at the foot of the Sinai high mountain region, the "Roof of Egypt", where Egypt's highest mountains are found.

The town also puts pressure on the water resources, as groundwater in the valley is from the mountains. As of September 28, 2011, water from the Nile is being transported to Saint Catherine via a pipeline, built with the help of the European Union.

Climate data for Saint Catherine (1961–1990 normals, extremes 2007–2022)
| Month | Jan | Feb | Mar | Apr | May | Jun | Jul | Aug | Sep | Oct | Nov | Dec | Year |
|---|---|---|---|---|---|---|---|---|---|---|---|---|---|
| Record high °C (°F) | 28.0 (82.4) | 30.0 (86.0) | 32.0 (89.6) | 37.0 (98.6) | 38.0 (100.4) | 39.1 (102.4) | 40.0 (104.0) | 42.0 (107.6) | 40.0 (104.0) | 36.0 (96.8) | 29.0 (84.2) | 26.0 (78.8) | 42.0 (107.6) |
| Mean daily maximum °C (°F) | 13.8 (56.8) | 14.6 (58.3) | 18.5 (65.3) | 24.1 (75.4) | 27.9 (82.2) | 30.9 (87.6) | 32.0 (89.6) | 32.0 (89.6) | 30.5 (86.9) | 25.7 (78.3) | 19.9 (67.8) | 15.7 (60.3) | 23.8 (74.8) |
| Daily mean °C (°F) | 9.5 (49.1) | 10.2 (50.4) | 14.2 (57.6) | 19.0 (66.2) | 23.1 (73.6) | 25.4 (77.7) | 26.5 (79.7) | 26.0 (78.8) | 24.7 (76.5) | 19.8 (67.6) | 14.7 (58.5) | 11.1 (52.0) | 18.7 (65.6) |
| Mean daily minimum °C (°F) | 1.7 (35.1) | 2.4 (36.3) | 5.7 (42.3) | 10.1 (50.2) | 14.1 (57.4) | 16.2 (61.2) | 17.7 (63.9) | 17.6 (63.7) | 15.9 (60.6) | 12.0 (53.6) | 7.4 (45.3) | 3.7 (38.7) | 10.4 (50.7) |
| Record low °C (°F) | −4.0 (24.8) | −6.0 (21.2) | 0.0 (32.0) | 2.0 (35.6) | 8.0 (46.4) | 13.0 (55.4) | 12.0 (53.6) | 15.0 (59.0) | 11.0 (51.8) | 5.0 (41.0) | 1.0 (33.8) | −2.0 (28.4) | −6.0 (21.2) |
| Average precipitation mm (inches) | 3 (0.1) | 2 (0.1) | 4 (0.2) | 4 (0.2) | 0 (0) | 0 (0) | 0 (0) | 0 (0) | 0 (0) | 1 (0.0) | 3 (0.1) | 4 (0.2) | 21 (0.9) |
| Average rainy days (≥ 1.0 mm) | 0.1 | 0.1 | 0.1 | 0 | 0 | 0 | 0 | 0 | 0 | 0 | 0 | 0.1 | 0.4 |
| Average relative humidity (%) | 39 | 35 | 29 | 22 | 19 | 20 | 22 | 24 | 25 | 28 | 33 | 36 | 27.7 |
Source: NOAA

=== Nature ===
The city of Saint Catherine and other close towns fall within the region of Saint Katherine Protectorate, which was established in 1988.

Its unique high-altitude ecosystem with many endemic and rare species, include the world's smallest butterfly (the Sinai baton blue butterfly), flocks of Nubian ibex, and hundreds of different plants of medicinal value. The region has been declared a UNESCO World Heritage Area. Some of the species are endangered.

Sinai agamas, rock hyraxes, and foxes can be seen. Harmless to people, foxes regularly visit the town at night to steal and scavenge. Rock hyraxes are often seen frequenting gardens including a wide range having migrated from Europe. Feral donkeys in the mountains have migrated to the region and lower-lying areas (reportedly as far as El Tur) in the winter and return to graze during the summer. Many of them belong to families and are branded. There is a move to reduce their numbers by the Saint Katherine City Council.

One of the principal goals of the Protectorate is to preserve the biodiversity of the fragile ecosystem, with an emphasis on the Nubian ibex and the wild medicinal and aromatic plants. The St. Katherine Protectorate is a major job provider in the area, although the number of local Bedouins employed has fallen sharply since the initial European Union support ended.

Snow is the best source of water as it melts slowly, thus releasing water at a steady pace, replenishing the underwater catchment areas. Water from rain flows quickly in the barren mountains, which may cause flash floods.

The highest mountain in Egypt is Mount Catherine, with many other peaks in the area over 2,000 m (6,600 ft).

== Religion ==
Saint Catherine is in a region holy to the world's three major Abrahamic religions (monotheistic religions), Christianity, Islam, and Judaism. It is the place where Moses is believed to have received the Ten Commandments, and a number of events recorded in the Bible took place in the area. Christian monks settled here in the 3rd century, and the Orthodox monastic tradition continues to the present day. The Prophet Muhammad took the monastery under his protection in his Letter to the Monks. There are two ancient churches, and the Monastery of Saint Catherine and the Rock of Moses.

== Culture and population ==
The traditional people of the area, the Jebeliya Bedouin, were brought in the 6th century CE. Originally Christians, they converted to Islam and intermarried with other nomadic tribes. Some segments of the tribe arrived relatively recently from the Arabian Peninsula. Their culture is similar to other Bedouin groups, but they have preserved some unique features. Contrary to other Bedouin tribes, the Jebeliya have always practiced agriculture and are expert gardeners, which is evident in the wadis around Saint Catherine. They continue to live in a symbiotic relationship with the monastery and its monks, and today many Bedouins work with the monastery on its compound or in its gardens.

The city also hosts a number of Greeks and Russians, who come to work at the monastery.

The Jebeliya are gardeners and craftsmen who have been building gardens, houses, storerooms, water dams and other structures in the Sinai mountains for centuries.

The techniques used are similar to Byzantine methods, partly because of the natural environment, and partly because of the interaction between the Bedouin and the monastery. They received seeds from the monks to start crops. They grow vegetables and fruit in stone-walled gardens called Bustan or karm and mastered grafting, where a branch of a higher-yielding lowland variety is planted (grafted) on a more resistant but low-yielding mountain variety.

Many species of plants and crops grow here because of the moderate climate. Some fruits include the apple, pear, apricot, peach, fig, pistachio, date and grape. Walnut is rare but grown at a few locations. Mulberry grows wild in some of the wadis, and they belong to the whole tribe. Wild figs grow in many places. Olives are essential to the natives and are found in many locations. Vegetables are not grown as much as in the past because of the lack of water. Flowers and medicinal herbs are common.

Water is often found at higher elevations, either in natural springs or in wells made at dykes called Jidda. The Bedouins built small dams and closed off canyons to make reservoirs. In either case, water is channeled to small rock pools called birka, from where it was available for irrigation. Water runs, sometimes for miles, in narrow conduits made of flat rocks which are still visible, but today gardens rely on plastic pipes (Khartoum). These gardens are a unique feature of the high mountain area, along with other stone and rock structures.

Bedouin houses are small, simple stone structures with cane roofing, either incorporated into the garden wall or standing alone a bit further up from the wadi floor, away from the devastating flash floods that sweep through after occasional heavy rains. Houses are often built next to huge boulders where the boulder serves as an exterior wall. Natural cracks and holes are used as shelves and candle holders inside the house.

Smaller rock shelters and store rooms are constructed under boulders and in walled-up caves and are found throughout the mountainous area. Some of them are easily visible landmarks, such as in Abu Seila or Farsh Rummana, but most are hard to distinguish from the landscape.

Ancient leopard traps can be seen in many places, either under boulders such as in Wadi Talaa, or standing alone as on the top of Abu Geefa. A goat was placed inside as bait, and when the trap was tripped by a leopard, a large rock fell to block the entrance. Leopards are now extinct in Sinai; the last was spotted in the 1980s.

In many places, big boulders can be seen with oval-shaped marks engraved on the surface. They are marriage proposal rocks, where a lover drew a line around his foot on the rock face next to his lover's footprint. If the two marks are encircled, their wish was granted and they married.

Wishing rocks are boulders, usually a short distance from the main paths, with a flat top. According to local legend, if one throws a pebble and it stays on the top, one's wish will come true.

=== Planned growth ===
According to the governmental plans, the population of the city is expected to increase from 4,603 to 17,378 in 2017. 3,031 (75.1%) of Saint Catherine's population is formed of Jebeliya Bedouins, while the rest are Egyptians, Greeks, Russians and western Europeans. Assuming a natural growth rate of 3% by 2017, the Bedouin population would become a minority in Saint Catherine, dropping to 36% of the total population if the Egyptian Ministry of Planning targets are achieved.

=== Demographic breakdown ===
The population of Saint Catherine by settlement, according to a survey carried out by St Katherine Protectorate in 1998:

- Abo Seilah: 247
- Lower Esbaeia: 165
- Esbaeia Safha: 22
- Upper Esbaeia: 71
- Arbeien: 47
- El Oskof El Hamami: 93
- Mekhlafa: 59
- El Kharrazin: 43
- Er Raha: 166
- Rahba: 52
- Er Ramthi: 25
- Ez Zaytonah: 34
- Es Sedoud: 12
- Sheikh Awwad & Gharba: 159
- Sebaia Safha: 78
- Sebaia Soweria: 17
- Sebaia Elbasra: 61
- Noumana: 49
- Solaf: 157
- Sahab: 83
- Sheikh Mohsen: 22
- Beiar Et Tor: 178
- Lower Nasab: 30
- Upper Nasab: 84

== Places of interest ==
In addition to Saint Catherine's Monastery and Mount Sinai, of prime historical interest is the palace of Abbas I, the Wali and self-declared Khedive of Egypt and Sudan between 1849 and 1854. The palace was built on a mountain at the time called Jebel Tinya, but later named after him and today called Jebel Abbas Basha. The palace was never finished, as he died before it was completed, but the massive 2-metre-thick (6.6 ft) walls made of granite blocks and granite-sand bricks stand firmly. The open quarry on the top of Jebel Somra, just opposite Jebel Abbas Basha, is still visible with many huge blocks. Other blocks were cut from Wadi Zawatin, at the beginning of the ascent to the palace. The bricks were made on site while the mortar, made of lime and water, was burnt in kilns in the surrounding valleys. To be able to carry out the work, first, a road accessible to camels and donkeys was built in order to transport the supplies. The road, starting at Abu Jeefa and going through Wadi Tubuq and Wadi Zawatin, is still used today.

Grandson and successor of the reformist Muhammad Ali Pasha (1805–1848), Abbas Pasha was in many ways the opposite. He had "a lasting distrust of foreigners, strongly opposed many of the Western-inspired changes introduced by his father Mohammed Ali Pasha, and he is remembered as a traditionalist and reactionary who undid many of his grandfather's modernizing reforms. His secretive and suspicious nature led to much speculation over his death; it is uncertain whether he was murdered or died of a stroke."

Because Abbas Pasha suffered from tuberculosis, one of the reasons he began building a palace in the high mountains was for medical reasons. On the other hand, he liked a secluded lifestyle and had other remote palaces. According to tradition, he selected the place after placing meat on the top of Mount Sinai, Mount Catherine and Mount Tinya. Where the meat took longer to decay, suggested a better environment and cleaner air. Another account recalls that this story was actually made up by the monks to keep him away from the holy peaks.

Although Abbas is "best remembered for the emancipation of the fellaheen and the construction of the Cairo-Alexandria railway line in 1851", he "had a significant influence on the immediate area around Saint Catherine. Besides the construction of the mountain-top palace, he commissioned the building of the camel path up to Mount Sinai and the Askar barracks on the way to the monastery, which now lies in ruins."

There are hundreds of ruins of Byzantine monasteries, churches, and monastic settlements in the area, some of them not much more than a pile of rocks, and others difficult to distinguish from Bedouin buildings, but there are also several very well-preserved ones. Many can be found in the Bustan el Birka area, approachable from the settlements of Abu Seila and Abu Zaituna, including churches, houses on hills overlooking gardens in the wadi floor, buildings in clusters and hermit cells under rocks.

As another example, a well-preserved church in Wadi Shrayj, can be found after passing other somewhat ruined Byzantine buildings. Further up from the church, are more ruins, some dating back to the Nabataean era (c. 300 BC–AD 100).

In Wadi Mathar (Wadi Shaq) is a hermit cell under a huge boulder. The remains of the monks who died there centuries ago are in the walled-up chamber. Further up is a well-preserved monastic settlement with houses and a round building that might have been a storage room.

Byzantine Nawamis, circular prehistoric stone tombs, are found at many locations, such as at the beginning of Wadi Jebal or in Wadi Mathar. Halfway to Wadi Jebal, is a Roman well, and further on a well-preserved Byzantine church next to a walled garden and spring. Another church is at the spring of Ain Nagila, at the foot of Jebel el Bab. Ruins of other settlements and buildings can be found in Wadi Tinya, Wadi Shaq Tinya, Farsh Abu Mahashur, and other places.

The building technique of the Bedouin was taken from the Byzantine settlers, so it is often difficult to tell structures apart. Furthermore, the Bedouin often reused the ruins in later times. However, there are telling clues—Byzantine buildings were scattered close to each other in small settlements, and round buildings are most likely to be from the Byzantine period. While the Bedouin constructed storage rooms under rocks, they would have been too low for hermits to pray in an upright, kneeling position. Rounded walls, niches and shelves, and tiny doors are typical of Byzantine stone dwellings. Stones were laid without mortar and roofs were often absent.

Traces of ancient water systems or conduits can also be found which were used to direct rainwater to the settlement and for irrigation. Typical of the Byzantine era, water conduits or channels directed the mountain rains to cisterns or pools. Water conduits were constructed using natural drainage lines in granite and by cementing flat stones with natural mortar. The outdoor courtyards are thought to have been used for meeting guests and for cooking.

A bit further afield, at Serabit al-Khadim, are ancient turquoise mines and pharaonic temples from the 12th Dynasty dedicated to Hathor, goddess of love, music, and beauty, and from the New Kingdom dedicated to Sopdu, god of the Eastern Desert. It can be reached from Wadi Feiran via Wadi Mukattab (the "Valley of Inscriptions").

There is a mass of names (singular of nawamis) near the Oasis of Ain Hudra, as well as a rock with pharaonic inscriptions near the main road to Dahab, which can be found with the help of a guide.

The Blue Desert (Blue Mountain) can be seen just before reaching Saint Catherine to the left in a wide-open wadi. The display was made by Belgian artist Jean Verame in 1980–1981, who painted many of the boulders over an area of around 15 km^{2} (5.8 sq mi) and a hill blue. From the air, it looks like a dove of peace.

Beyond the many religious places found around the Monastery of Saint Catherine and on the top of Mount Sinai and Jebel Safsafa are many other churches, monasteries, and holy sites.

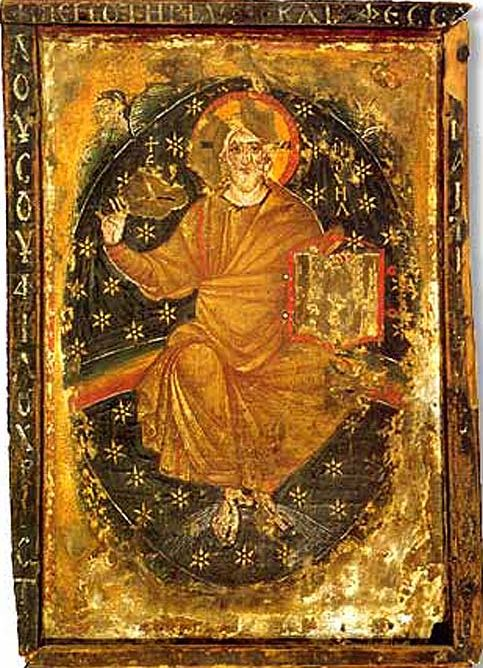
Vethiy Denmi (Icons from Saint Catherine's Monastery)

The Chapel of Saint Catherine is on the summit of Mount Catherine, the mountain where the body of the saint from Alexandria was placed by angels, according to Christian beliefs. The saint, born Dorothea in 294 AD, was educated in pagan schools but converted to Christianity, for which she was executed. Her body vanished, but some three centuries later, monks guided by a dream found it on the mountain. It was brought down and placed in a golden casket in the Monastery, which became known in the 11th century as the Monastery of Saint Catherine.

The Monastery of Saint Catherine has been a working monastery from its creation in the 4th century to the present day. It holds one of the most religiously and historically significant libraries in the world, second only to that of the Vatican. Being of religious importance to Jews, Muslims, and Christians the area receives nearly 100,000 visitors annually. While the struggle to limit access and visiting hours has done little to preserve the monastery, it has also provided a measure of protection during political turbulence.

The Hagar Musa (Rock of Moses) in Wadi El Arbain, from which the Prophet Moses produced water, is a holy place for the monotheistic religions of Judaism, Christianity and Islam. Locals believe the twelve clefts on it represent the twelve springs mentioned in the Quran (Sura 2:60). It is also mentioned in the Exodus as the rock which sustained the children of Israel (1 Cor. 10:4). There is a small Orthodox (Christian) chapel next to it. According to Swiss orientalist Johann Ludwig Burkhardt, the Jebeliya Bedouin believe "that by making [female camels] crouch down before the rock [...] the camels will become fertile and yield more milk". There is also a Bedouin marriage proposal rock in the walled compound.

The Monastery of the Forty Martyrs in Wadi El Arbain was constructed in the 6th century in honor of the forty Christian martyrs who died in Sebaste (central Turkey). Monks relate that forty Christian soldiers from the Roman Army in the 3rd century were commanded to worship pagan gods. They refused and were put to death by being exposed at night to the cold winds of a frozen lake. Those who survived until morning were killed by the sword. On the grounds of this monastery is a chapel dedicated to the hermit Saint Onuphrius. Coming from Upper Egypt, he was said to have lived for seventy years in the rock shelter at the northern end of the garden, until he died in AD 390.

The Monastery of Cosmas and Damianos in Wadi Talaa is named after the martyred brothers who were doctors and treated locals for free in the 3rd century AD. The garden of the monastery, looked after by a Bedouin family, has a long olive grove, some tall cypress trees, and other fruit trees and vegetables. There are more gardens belonging to the monastery further down in the wadi.

The Chapel of Saint John Klimakos (also known as "John of the Ladder"), was built in 1979 in Wadi Itlah to commemorate John Climacus's devotional work in the 6th century AD. Also spelled Saint John Climacus or Climax, the saint spent forty years in solitude in a cave above the existing chapel. "During this time, Klimakos was elected Abbot of Sinai and asked to write a spiritual guide. He composed The Ladder of Divine Ascent which likens spiritual life to the ladder seen by the Patriarch Jacob extending from earth to heaven (Genesis 28:12-17)." According to the book the ladder "consists of 30 rungs, each step corresponding to a spiritual virtue. Through silence and solitude hermits and monks sought to climb the divine ladder. The first rung instructs the renunciation of all earthly ties and the next 14 relate to human vices such as talkativeness, anger, despondency, and dishonesty. The final 15 rungs relate to virtues including meekness, simplicity, prayer, holy stillness and humility. The crowning virtue is love."

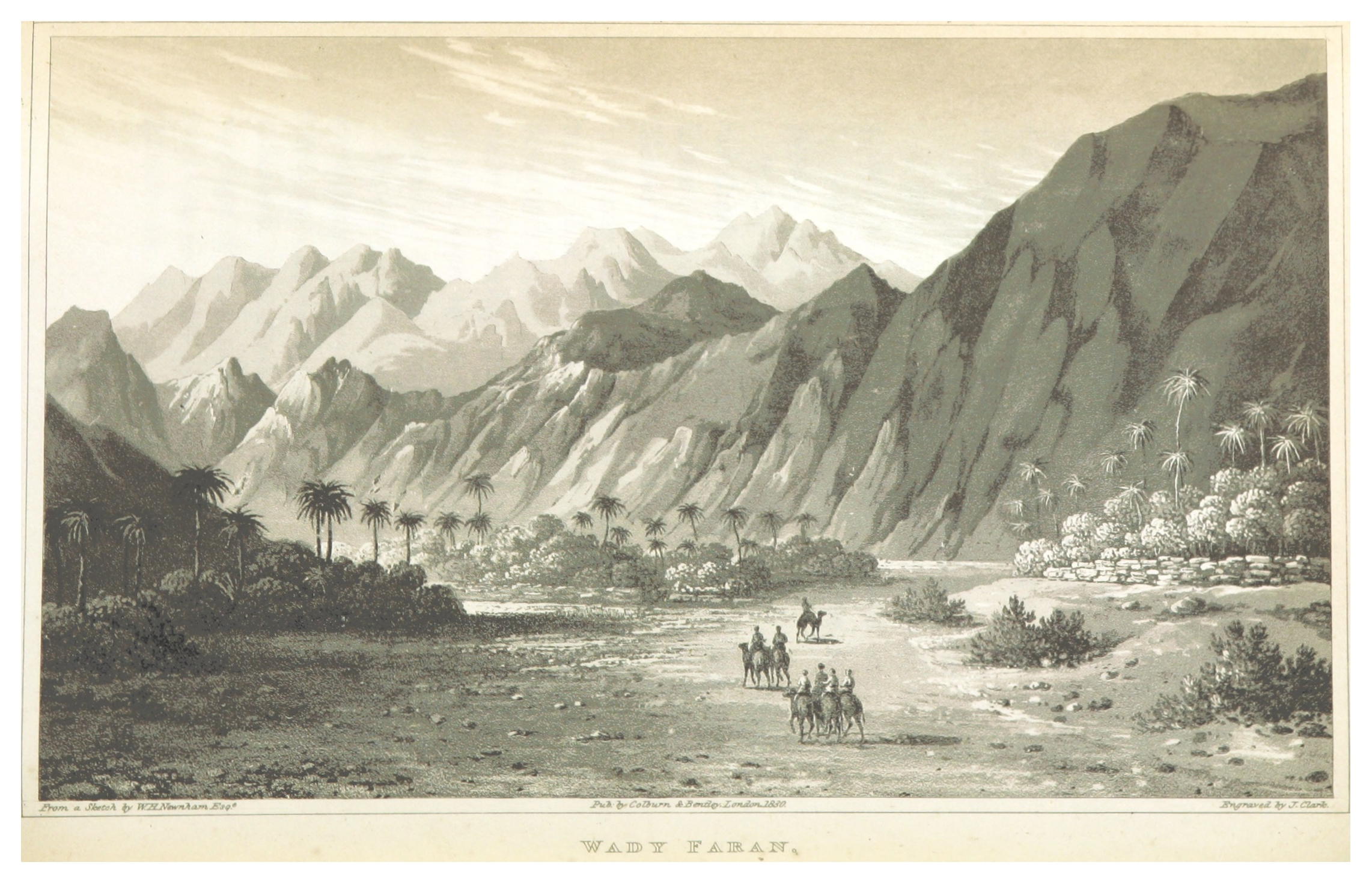
The Oasis of Wadi Fairan, c. 1830

The Monastery of Wadi Feiran, with its chapel dedicated to Prophet Moses, is some 60 kilometres (37 mi) before reaching Saint Catherine. The wadi is mentioned in Genesis (21:21) "as the place where Hagar dwelt with her son after Abraham sent her away". As late as the 7th century, Feiran was a city and an important Christian center, with its own bishop.

The Monastery of El Tur was built by Emperor Justinian in the important port city, which was an early Christian center from the 3rd century AD. Today it lies in ruins but there is a new monastery in the city, as well as a church and a guest house. The Spring of Moses is reputed to have therapeutic abilities.

Other important monasteries in the region are the Monastery of Ramhan south of Mount Catherine, the Monastery of Hodra near the oasis of Ain Hodra, and several smaller, ruined monasteries and churches. Most of the best-preserved are found close to the village of Saint Catherine in Wadi Shrayj, Wadi Anshel, Bustan el Birka, Wadi Abu Zaituna, and also in the High Mountains such as at Ain Nagila and in Wadi Jebal.

Places important to local people include the tombs of local saints such as Sheikh Harun (Aaron's Tomb) and Sheikh Salah (Nebi-Salah's Tomb) in Wadi Sheikh before reaching the town, or Sheikh Awad and Sheikh Ahmed in the mountains. Some of the Bedouin gather at these tombs to celebrate "Zuara", while others consider this practice to be "bidaa", an innovation and not consistent with Islam. (In fact, most of the bidaa actually predates Islam and is rather a survival of a tradition than an innovation.)

Zuara, also known as Sheikh Day or Mulid (Moulid), "is performed by most Sinai tribes at the tombs of Sheiks, or in nearby shelters called mak'ad when a Bedouin or group of Bedouin wish to ask the Sheikh to intervene with Allah on their behalf". Zuara is the generic name for any activity of this sort. In addition to the Mulid, the bedouins often practice Zuara on a weekly basis. The sick Bedouins or their relatives, pregnant mothers looking for healthy children, or people looking for a good crop, go to a tomb. Until the 1956 war in the Sinai, the Gebeliya and the Auled-Said shared a common Mulid (the annual Zuara) at the tomb of Nebi-Saleh; however, the war caused them to conduct the ceremonies at separate locations. The tribes are still apparently close. Now the Gebeliya go to Aaron's tomb, and the Auled-Said go to Nebi Salah's tomb. Both go in the 8th month. The Garasha and Sawalha also go to Nebi-Salah's tomb for their Mulid but in the 7th Month." Some of the Jebeliya gather at the Tomb of Sheikh Awad on the second day of Eid al-Adha, the "Feast of Sacrifice".

== See also ==
- North Sinai Governorate
- Nekhel
- Sharm El Sheikh
- St. Catherine International Airport
- Egyptian Protectorates

== Bibliography ==
- Shackley, Myra (1 January 1998). "A golden calf in sacred space?: The future of St Katherine's monastery, Mount Sinai (Egypt)". International Journal of Heritage Studies. 4 (3–4): 124–134. doi:10.1080/13527259808722230. ISSN 1352-7258.
