= Primula boveana =

Conservation status
- Critically Endangered (IUCN 3.1)

Scientific classification
- Kingdom: Plantae
- Clade: Tracheophytes
- Clade: Angiosperms
- Clade: Eudicots
- Clade: Asterids
- Order: Ericales
- Family: Primulaceae
- Genus: Primula
- Species: P. boveana

Binomial name
- Primula boveana Decne. ex Duby

Synonyms
- Evotrochis involucrata Raf.; Primula involucrata (Raf.) Link & Otto ex Sweet

Species of flowering plant

Primula boveana, also known as the Sinai primrose, is a species of flowering plant within the family Primulaceae. The species was named in honour of botanist and plant collector Nicolas Bové.

== Description ==
Primula boveana is a perennial species. Plants possess a basal rosette of greyish-green leaves. The leaves are spear-like in shape and grow up to 20 cm (7.9 in) long. Flowers are golden or yellow in colour, tubular and scented. The flowers are hosted on stems that can grow up to 60 cm (24 in) long. Plants flower in late spring and set seed by late summer.

== Distribution and habitat ==
Primula boveana is endemic to the Sinai Peninsula of Egypt, where it can only be found in the mountain area of the Saint Katherine Protectorate of southern Sinai. The climate is arid and dry, which restricts the available habitat where the species can grow. P. boveana grows in areas where the ground is moist such as in the vicinity of wells or areas fed by snow melt such as in the valleys in sheltered mountain areas. The species especially favours granite cliffs and caves with steep slopes. Plants grows in loamy sandy soils with an average pH 8.2. It has been recorded at altitudes ranging from 1,745 to 2,210 metres (5,730 to 7,250 ft) above sea level.

== Ecology ==
Primula boveana is the dominant plant species in a majority of the sites it grows in. Other plant species which are often seen growing alongside it include: Adiantum capillus-veneris, Mentha longifolia, Hypericum sinaicum and Juncus rigidus.

== Conservation ==
The entire population of Primula boveana is spread within nine subpopulations within the Saint Katherine Protectorate. By 2014 six of the nine subpopulations had been secured behind fenced enclosures. The populations are monitored by SKP rangers to detect population trends and to identify any causes of decline.

The UNEP funded the Medicinal Plants Conservation Project, which aims to conserve important plant species such as Primula boveana. The project involves both the cultivating of plants within greenhouses and the storing of seeds for future use.
