= St. Catherine International Airport =

Airport serving in the South Sinai Governorate of Egypt

- IATA: SKV; ICAO: HESC

Summary
- Airport type: Public
- Operator: Government
- Location: St. Catherine, Egypt
- Elevation AMSL: 4,368 ft (1,331 m)
- Coordinates: 28°41′07″N 034°03′45″E

Map
- Location within Egypt

Runways
Direction	Length		Surface
Direction	m	ft	Surface
17/35	2,115	6,939	Asphalt
- Source: DAFIF

St. Catherine International Airport (IATA: SKV, ICAO: HESC) is an airport serving St. Catherine (or St. Katherine), Saint Katherine city in the South Sinai Governorate of Egypt. It is located about 20 km (12 mi.) northeast of the city, which is near Mount Sinai.

== Airlines and destinations ==
There are currently no scheduled services to and from the airport. In 2011, the airport served 247 passengers (-72.6% vs. 2010).
