= Wadi Mukattab =

Egyptian site known for ancient inscriptions

Coordinates: 28.8616°N 33.4227°E

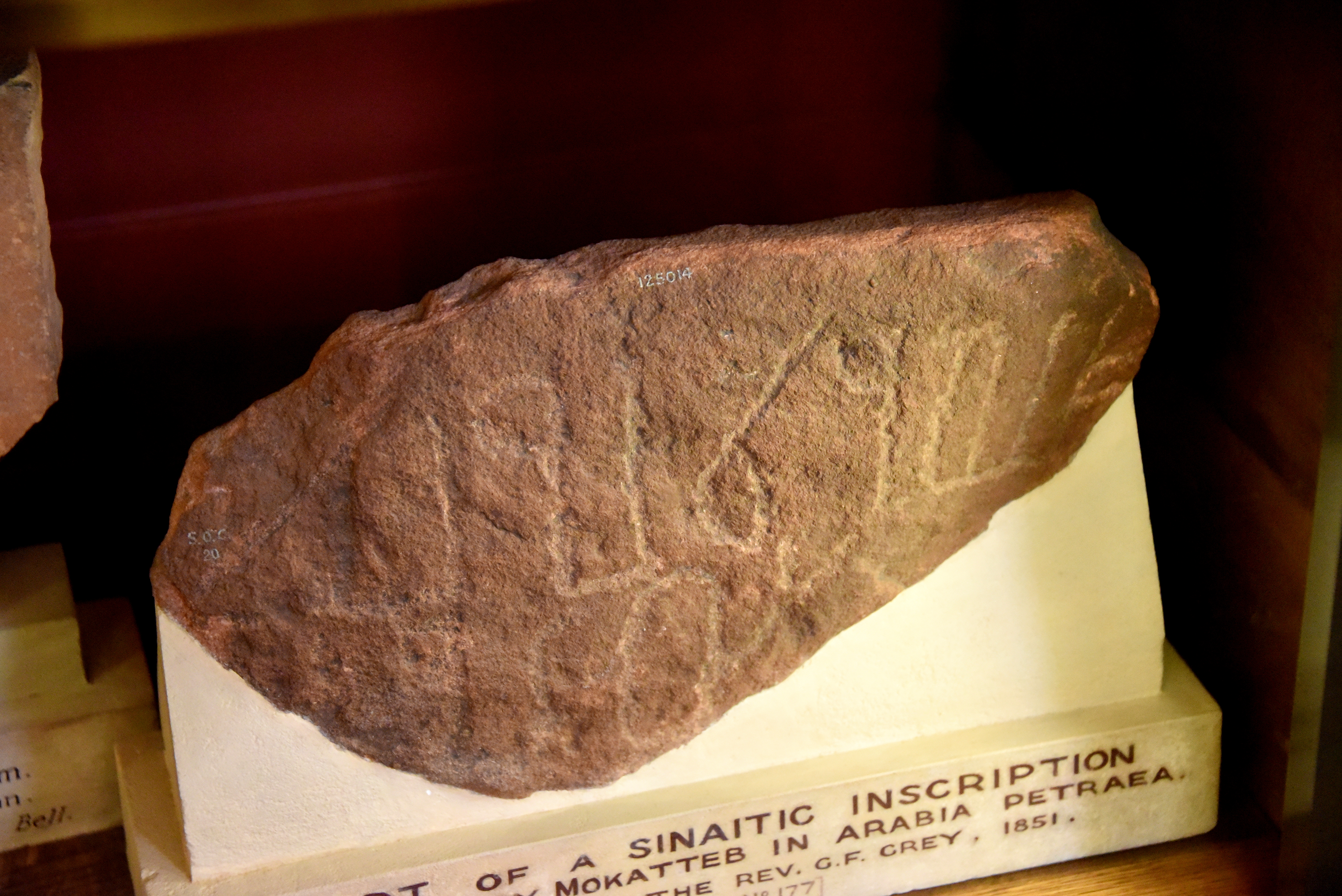
Fragmentary natural slab, red sandstone. It is incised with Nabataean or Sinaitic inscriptions. From Wadi Mukattab, Egypt. Probably Nabataean period. The British Museum, London

The Wadi Mukattab (Arabic for "Valley of Writing"), also known as the Valley of Inscriptions, is a wadi on Egypt's Sinai Peninsula near St Catherine's Monastery. It links the main road in the Wadi Feiran with the Wadi Maghareh's ancient turquoise mining area. The wadi is named after its valley's many petroglyphs. Nabataean and Greek inscriptions are abundant.

== Notable inscriptions ==
- Several texts use the provincial dating system introduced after Roman annexation of Arabia in 106 AD, including dates of "year 45" and "year 85 of the province" (i.e., AD 149 and AD 191).
- One inscription mentions "the three Caesars," likely the Severan emperors Septimius Severus, Caracalla, and Geta.

== Gallery ==
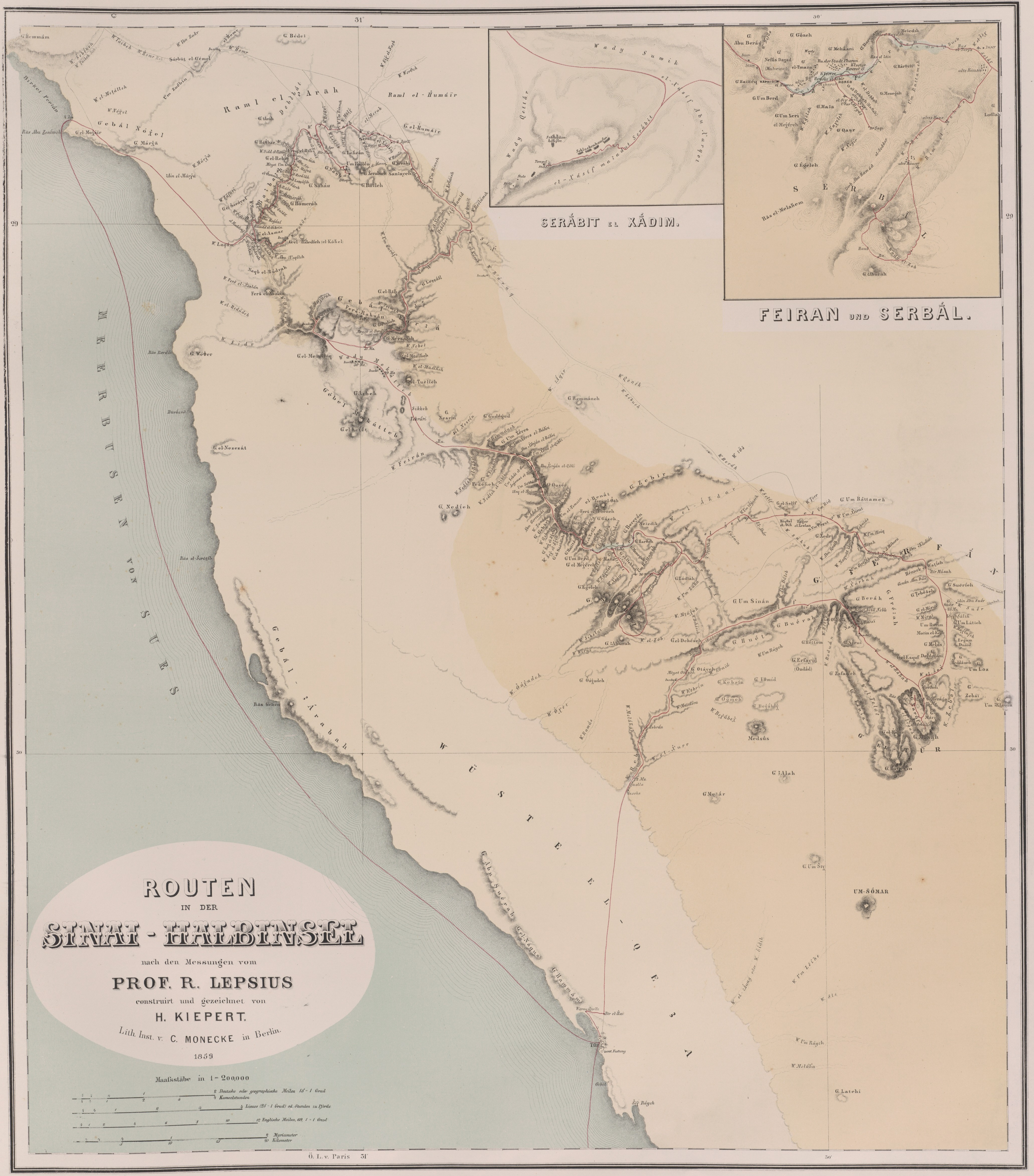
Lepsius's route in 1859, showing the inscriptions

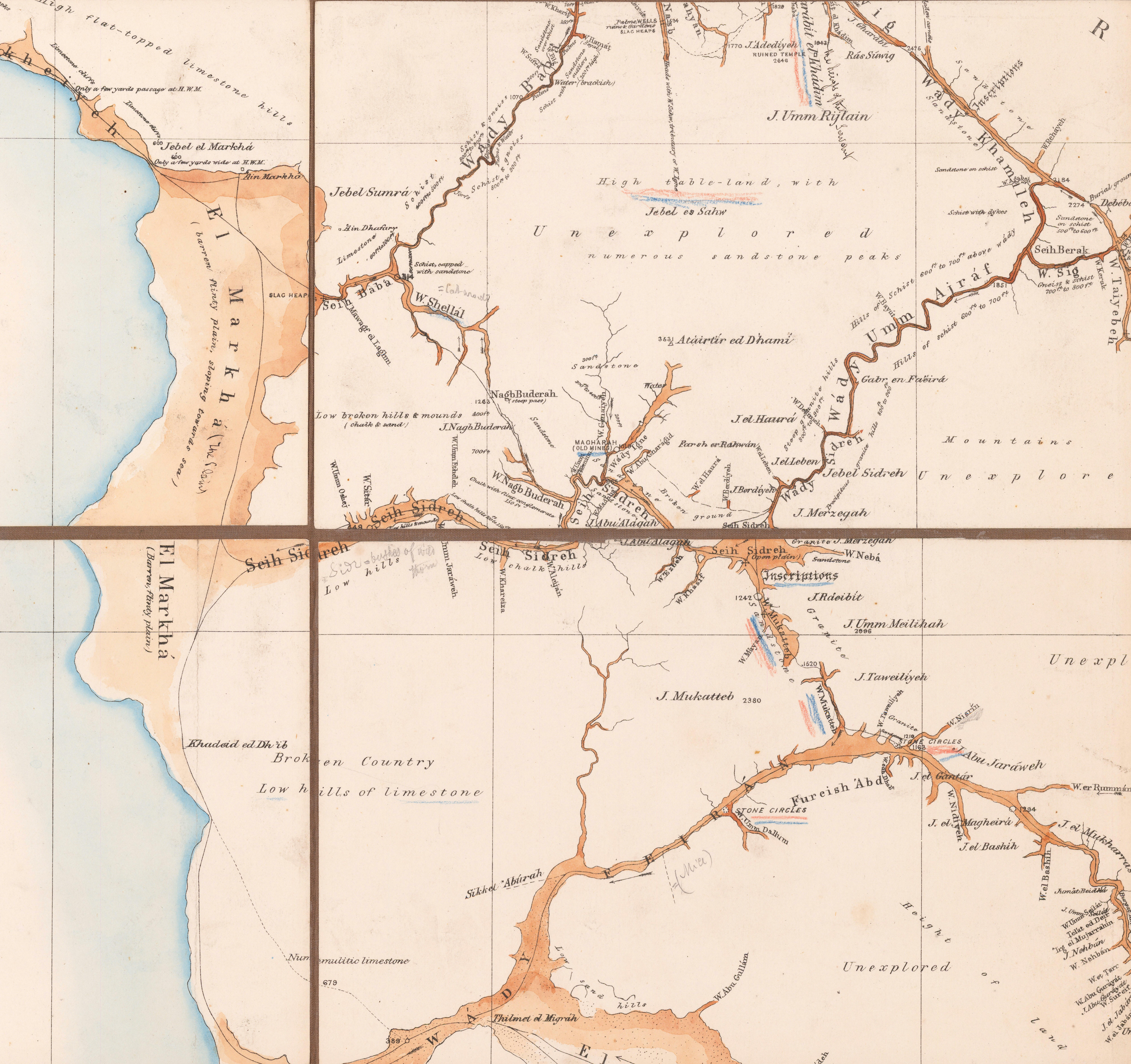
Wadi Mukattab in the 1869 Ordnance Survey map

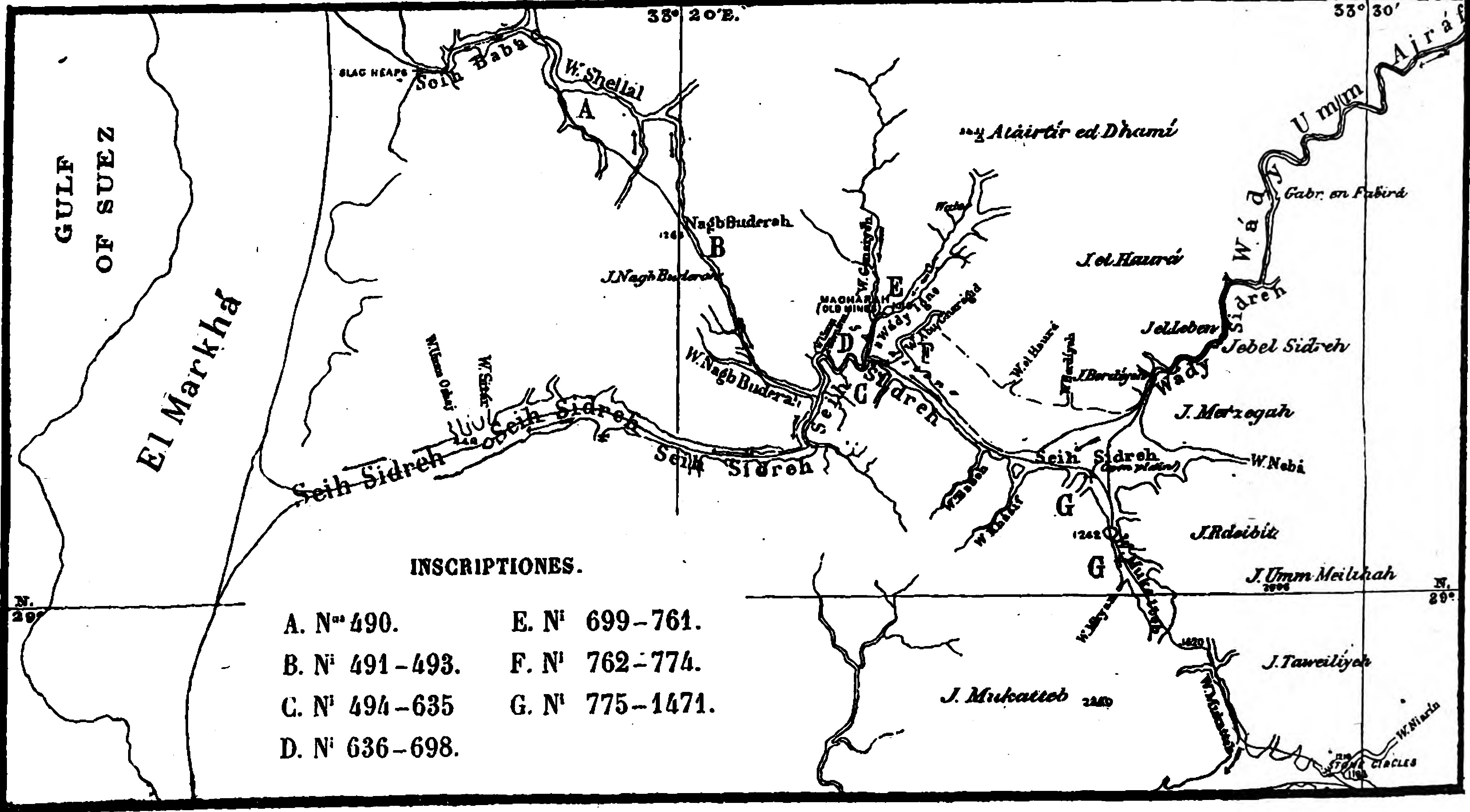
Nabataean inscriptions in the Corpus Inscriptionum Semiticarum in Wadi Mukattab

== See also ==
- Georgian graffiti of Nazareth and Sinai
- Rivers of Egypt
- Biblical Sinai
