= Blue Desert =

Area of the Sinai Desert in Egypt

- Desert
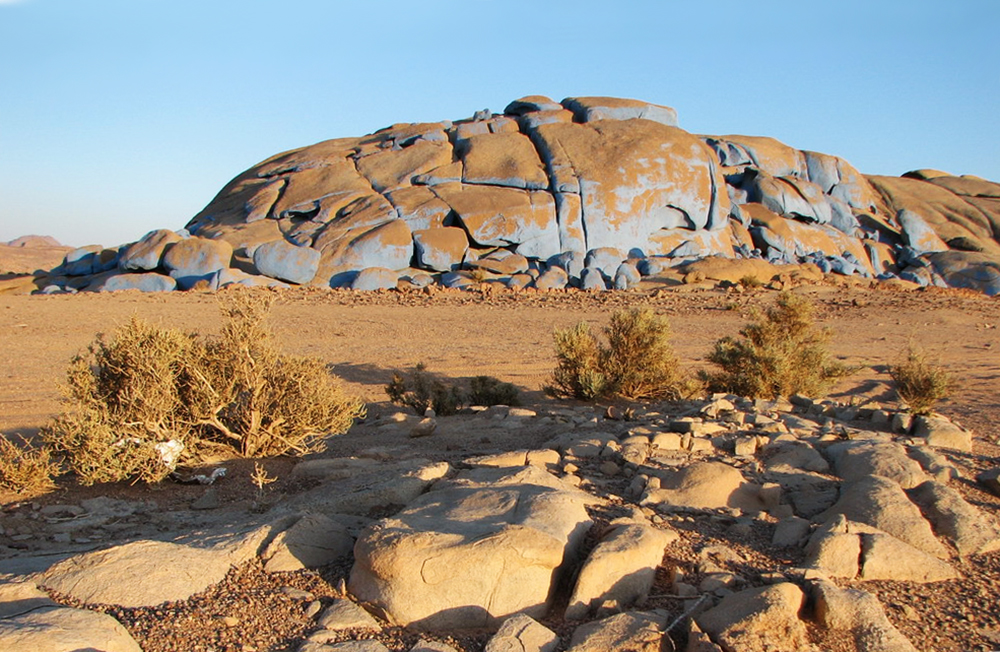
- The Blue Desert in 2016, somewhat faded

- Location within Egypt
- Coordinates: 28.639722°N 34.560833°E
- Location: South Sinai, Egypt

Area
  - Total: 14 kilometres (8.7 mi)^{2}

Dimensions
  - Length: 6.5 kilometres (4.0 mi)
- Creator: Jean Verame
- created in: 1980

The Blue Desert (Arabic: الصحراء الزرقاء, romanized: aṣ-Ṣaḥrāʾ az-Zarqāʾ; also known as the Sinai Peace Junction) is an area of the Sinai Desert near Saint Catherine, where a number of rocks are painted blue.

This piece of art was created in 1980 when, following the signing of the 1979 Egypt–Israel peace treaty, Belgian artist Jean Verame visited Sinai to paint a line of peace. Verame gained the permission of Egyptian President Anwar Sadat and received a grant of ten tons of paint from the United Nations.

== History ==
After the official signing of the Israel-Egypt Peace Treaty in Washington DC on 26 March 1979, Belgian artist Jean Verame wanted to celebrate this historical peace in his own way.

Verame first came to Sinai in 1978. Inspired by the hit song "Don't It Make My Brown Eyes Blue", he spent two years attempting to gain permission from Egyptian authorities to pursue his artistic dream. With the official approval of Egypt's president at the time, Anwar El-Sadat himself, and 10 tonnes of paint provided by the UN, Jean started painting the desert blue. One year later, the "Line of Peace", or the "Sinai Peace Junction" as it is also sometimes called, extended almost 6.5km with boulders rising up to nine meters in height, all painted blue.

== Location ==
The Blue Desert stretches between Dahab and St Catherine, known as the Plateau of Hallaoui.

== Other places ==
Four years after Sinai's Line of Peace, Verame completed another blue painting. This time, it was in Tafraout, Morocco. With approval granted by the late Moroccan Monarch King Hassan II, Verame went into the mountains with a team of firemen and 18 tons of blue, red, violet and white paint. In three months he and his team painted granite boulders and small hills of the Anti-Atlas Mountains: "Les Pierres Bleus" (The Blue Rocks).

== Gallery ==
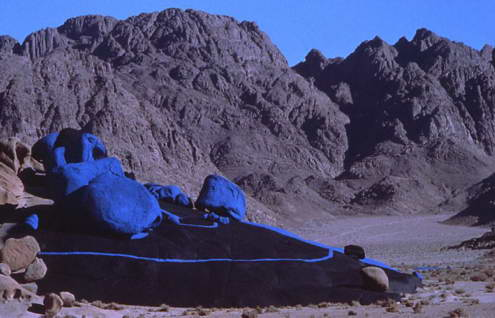

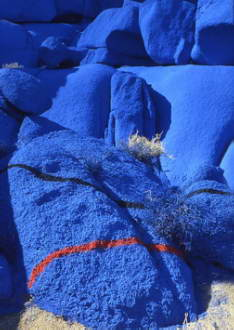

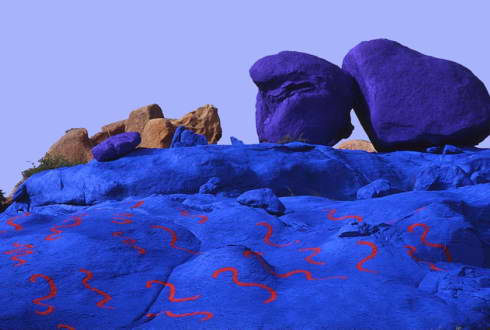
