= Pseudophilotes sinaicus =

Sinai baton blue

Conservation status
- Critically Endangered (IUCN 3.1)

Scientific classification
- Kingdom: Animalia
- Phylum: Arthropoda
- Class: Insecta
- Order: Lepidoptera
- Family: Lycaenidae
- Genus: Pseudophilotes
- Species: P. sinaicus

Binomial name
- Pseudophilotes sinaicus Nakamura, 1975

Species of butterfly

Pseudophilotes sinaicus, the Sinai baton blue, one of the world's smallest butterflies, lives only on mountainside patches of Sinai thyme in an arid corner of the Sinai Peninsula in Egypt called Saint Katherine Protectorate.

== Life cycle ==
The female butterfly lays about 20–30 eggs in spring, a day after mating, on the young buds of its host plant, Sinai thyme (Thymus decussatus). After an incubation period of a few days, the eggs hatch into small larvae which feed on the buds and flowers of Sinai thyme. These larvae make an appeasement relationship with one type of ant (Lepisiota obtusa). The larva has two organs that it uses in its relationship with ants; the dorsal nectary organ (which secretes droplets of simple sugars and amino acids for this ant species) and the tentacular organ (which produces volatile secretions that attract and alert attendant ants if a caterpillar is alarmed). However, larvae are also heavily preyed upon by another species of ant, Crematogaster aegyptiaca. This ant is very influential to the local distribution of the butterfly because in areas where it is found, no butterflies survive.

Larval development takes about 21 days. On reaching full size, larvae descend to the bottom of the thyme plant and pupate. The pupae spend the whole autumn and winter in their cocoons, and when the temperature rises in late spring (during April to June), the adults emerge and males begin searching for females.

The whole life cycle of this butterfly depends upon the Sinai thyme. This plant is also rare and localized to this small area of the world. It grows in patches of various sizes only on the mountains around the town of St Katherine.

== Challenges ==
The Sinai baton blue has a highly localized distribution, mainly because of its dependence on Sinai thyme which occurs as discrete patches in the mountains. This butterfly is a poor flier, and individuals can not usually move more than 100 m. Thus the Sinai baton blue is a patchily distributed organism that is a very poor disperser between patches: it qualifies under the definition of a metapopulation.

The patch network is likely to be dynamic as a consequence of disturbance resulting from grazing, over-collection for medicinal purposes and the influence of global warming. These variables will affect the spatial pattern and size of the butterfly's habitat and are problems managers face with many species elsewhere that live in dynamic and fragmented landscapes. According to these effects, the population on each patch can die out. If this happens, it can only be re-established by colonisation from another patch. The further away the patch is, the harder it is to colonize for these poor fliers, and therefore the less likely the recolonisation will be. Thus two main factors affect the likelihood of long-term survival: patch areas (affecting population size and therefore extinction probability), and distance between patches (influencing how easy it is to recolonise a patch).

== Factors affecting Sinai thyme patches ==
=== Grazing ===
Bedouins came to St Katherine 1500 years ago. Now there are about 4500 Bedouins living around the town. Most families keep a small herd of goats and sheep. These herds are valuable resources for their livelihood because goats and sheep provide them with meat and milk, as well as wool, hair and skin. Herds are always in need of fodder. Because of the arid climate of St Katherine and the high price of fodder, grazing is the only choice. In the past, the Bedouins had developed a system for rotating grazing pressure in order to protect plants. This system is called helf, and is an agreement between themselves on banning grazing in certain wadis for specified periods of time. Today, this system has fallen into disuse, threatening many plant species. There is also a change in the lifestyle of St Katherine Bedouin since their population multiplied. Their lifestyle has switched from pastoral semi-nomadism to one that is largely sedentary, and this change has altered the pattern of grazing pressure. It has been demonstrated by Mike James and Martin Hoyle that the overall pattern of grazing pressure is affected by two main factors: altitude, and distance from villages. Usually the higher wadis and the ones far from villages get less grazing. Grazing pressure adversely affects the health of plants. Sinai thyme is a preferred plant to herds because it does not secrete toxic substances like some other plants.

In fact, the current levels of grazing with the current year-to-year variation in temperature are not a serious risk to the Sinai baton blue. Increased grazing pressure together with the expected rise in temperature over the coming years would be the main cause of the extinction of this small butterfly.

Hoyle and James found that even if goats ate up 60 percent of the thyme, the butterflies would be likely to survive. But when average temperatures warmed slightly above a critical threshold, the entire butterfly population would suddenly crash.

=== Over-collection ===
Sinai is a rich area in medicinal plants, especially around the St Katherine area. The St Katherine Protected Area contains more than 100 species of medicinal and herbal plants which are threatened by over-collection.

Over-collection coupled with grazing pushes many species of plants to extinction. In the last ten years unmanaged human activities have threatened endemic and rare species with extinction, resulted in disappearance of pastoral plant communities, and have caused an increased dominance of unpalatable plant species, in lower wadis and around settlements.

Sinai thyme is one of the plants suffers from over-collection. It is used as a medicinal plant by Bedouins and can also be sold in Cairo at a high price. Over-collection can result in the complete elimination of one patch or more of this plant. The loss of Sinai thyme patches adversely affects the persistence of the Sinai baton blue butterfly. It can lead to extinction of whole populations which may not be able to recolonized by other individuals from other populations.
