= Climate of Egypt =

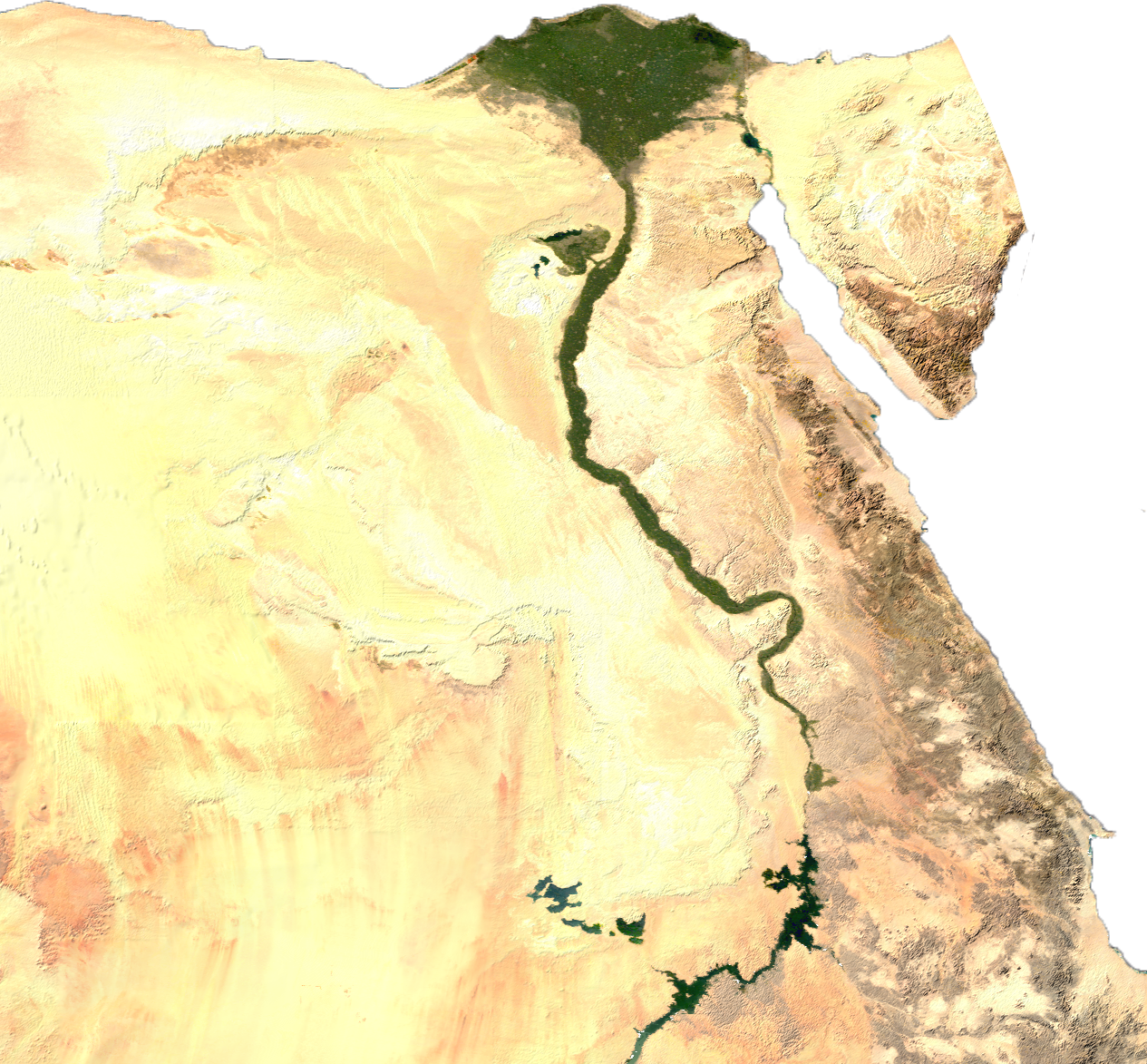
Satellite map

Köppen climate map of Egypt

Essentially all of Egypt has a hot desert climate (Köppen climate classification BWh). The climate is generally extremely dry all over the country except on the northern Mediterranean coast which receives rainfall in winter. In addition to rarity of rain, extreme heat during summer months is also a general climate feature of Egypt although daytime temperatures are more moderated along the northern coast.

== Prevailing wind ==
The cold prevailing northwesterly wind from Greece continuously blows over the northern coast without the interposition of an eventual mountain range and thus, greatly moderates temperatures throughout the year. Because of the effect, average low temperatures vary from 9–13 °C (48–55 °F) in wintertime to 22–25 °C (71.6–77.0 °F) in summertime and average high temperatures vary from 15–20 °C (59.0–68.0 °F) in wintertime to 27–35 °C (80.6–95.0 °F) in summertime. Though temperatures are moderated along the coasts, the situation changes in the interior, which is away from the moderating northerly winds. Thus, in the central and the southern parts, daytime temperatures are very hot, especially in summers when average high temperatures can exceed 41 °C (106 °F), as in Aswan and Luxor, which are located in the deserts of Egypt. Despite the mild weather in the winter, the temperature at night decreases to be very cold at times, sometimes to at or below freezing, especially in the interior lands of Upper Egypt. The desert regions can also see temperatures below freezing during winter nights.

== Sand storms ==
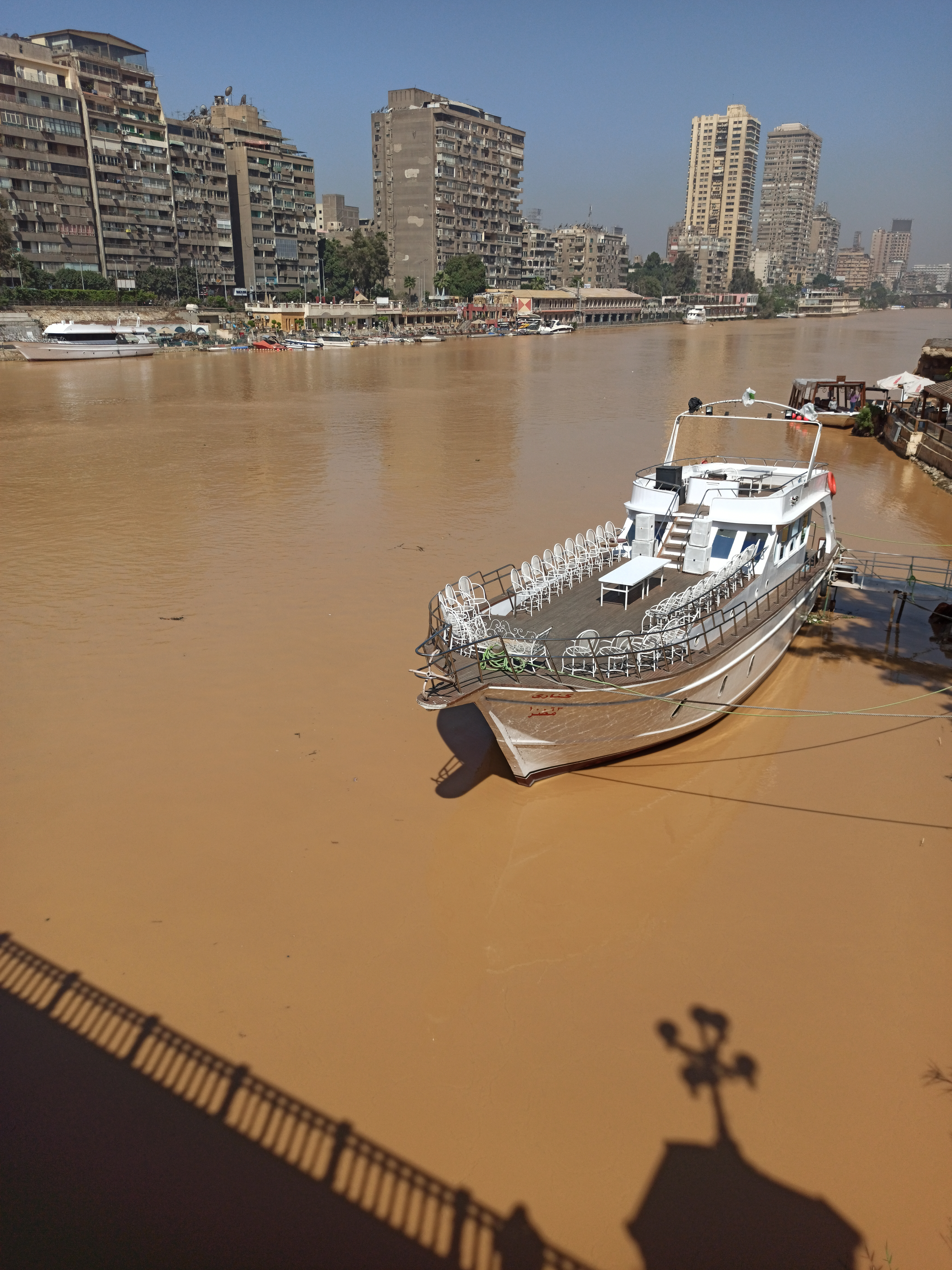
The Nile after the ″dragon storm″ in March 2020

Every year, sometime from March to June, an extremely hot, dry and dusty wind blows from the south or the southwest. This wind is called khamasīn. When the flow of dry air continuously blows over vast desert regions, it picks up fine sand and dust particles and finally results in a dusty wind which is generally felt in the periphery of the desert. When this wind blows over Egypt, it causes high temperatures to soar temporarily at dangerous levels, usually over 49–50 °C (120–122 °F), the relative humidity levels to drop under 5%. The khamasīn causes sudden, early heat waves and the absolute highest temperature records in Egypt.

== Rainfall ==
Egypt is the eighth most water stressed country in the world.

Egypt receives between 20 mm (0.79 in) and 200 mm (7.87 in) of annual average precipitation along the narrow Mediterranean coast, but south from Cairo, the average drops to nearly 0 millimetres (0.00 inches) in the central and the southern part of the country. The cloudiest, rainiest places are in and around Alexandria and Rafah. The sunshine duration is high all over Egypt, ranging from a low of 3,300 hours along the northernmost part in places such as Alexandria to reach a high of over 4,000 hours farther in the interior, in most of the country.

== Mountainous areas ==
Some mountainous locations in Sinai, such as Saint Catherine, have cooler night temperatures, due to their high elevations. It rarely snows in the Sinai mountains, but it almost never snows in the cities of Giza, Cairo, and Alexandria. For example, in December 2013, Cairo received a single overnight snowfall for the first time since 1899.

== General information ==
Climate data for Cairo (Cairo International Airport), 1991–2020 normals
Month	Jan	Feb	Mar	Apr	May	Jun	Jul	Aug	Sep	Oct	Nov	Dec	Year
Record high °C (°F)	31.0 (87.8)	34.8 (94.6)	39.6 (103.3)	43.2 (109.8)	47.8 (118.0)	46.4 (115.5)	44.3 (111.7)	43.4 (110.1)	43.7 (110.7)	41.0 (105.8)	37.4 (99.3)	31.7 (89.1)	47.8 (118.0)
Mean maximum °C (°F)	26.2 (79.2)	29.4 (84.9)	34.6 (94.3)	38.9 (102.0)	42.8 (109.0)	42.4 (108.3)	40.5 (104.9)	39.8 (103.6)	38.7 (101.7)	35.8 (96.4)	31.4 (88.5)	27.2 (81.0)	44.2 (111.6)
Mean daily maximum °C (°F)	18.9 (66.0)	20.5 (68.9)	23.8 (74.8)	28.1 (82.6)	32.2 (90.0)	34.6 (94.3)	35.0 (95.0)	34.9 (94.8)	33.4 (92.1)	30.0 (86.0)	24.9 (76.8)	20.5 (68.9)	28.1 (82.6)
Daily mean °C (°F)	14.4 (57.9)	15.6 (60.1)	18.3 (64.9)	21.8 (71.2)	25.6 (78.1)	28.2 (82.8)	29.1 (84.4)	29.2 (84.6)	27.6 (81.7)	24.6 (76.3)	20.0 (68.0)	15.9 (60.6)	22.5 (72.5)
Mean daily minimum °C (°F)	10.1 (50.2)	11.0 (51.8)	13.2 (55.8)	15.9 (60.6)	19.3 (66.7)	22.2 (72.0)	23.8 (74.8)	24.3 (75.7)	22.7 (72.9)	20.0 (68.0)	15.6 (60.1)	11.7 (53.1)	17.5 (63.5)
Mean minimum °C (°F)	5.4 (41.7)	6.0 (42.8)	7.6 (45.7)	10.4 (50.7)	14.3 (57.7)	18.2 (64.8)	20.3 (68.5)	20.6 (69.1)	17.9 (64.2)	14.5 (58.1)	10.2 (50.4)	6.8 (44.2)	4.3 (39.7)
Record low °C (°F)	1.2 (34.2)	3.6 (38.5)	5.0 (41.0)	7.6 (45.7)	12.3 (54.1)	16.0 (60.8)	18.2 (64.8)	19.0 (66.2)	14.5 (58.1)	12.3 (54.1)	5.2 (41.4)	3.0 (37.4)	1.2 (34.2)
Average precipitation mm (inches)	4.8 (0.19)	3.8 (0.15)	6.3 (0.25)	1.3 (0.05)	0.2 (0.01)	0 (0)	0 (0)	0 (0)	0 (0)	0.7 (0.03)	4.3 (0.17)	3.4 (0.13)	24.8 (0.98)
Average precipitation days (≥ 1.0 mm)	1.3	2.0	1.2	1.3	0.6	0.6	0.7	1.0	0.7	0.1	0.6	0.8	11.0
Average relative humidity (%)	59	54	53	47	46	49	58	61	60	60	61	61	56
Average dew point °C (°F)	5.2 (41.4)	5.0 (41.0)	6.1 (43.0)	7.5 (45.5)	10.1 (50.2)	13.9 (57.0)	17.5 (63.5)	18.3 (64.9)	16.7 (62.1)	14.0 (57.2)	10.7 (51.3)	6.7 (44.1)	11.0 (51.8)
Mean monthly sunshine hours	213	234	269	291	324	357	363	351	311	292	248	198	3,451
Percentage possible sunshine	66	75	73	75	77	85	84	86	84	82	78	62	77
Average ultraviolet index	4	5	7	9	10	11.5	11.5	11	9	7	5	3	7.8
Source 1: NOAA (humidity, dew point, records 1961–1990)
Source 2: Danish Meteorological Institute for sunshine (1931–1960) and Weather2Travel (ultraviolet)Egyptian Meteorological Authority / NOAA

Alexandria

Climate chart (precipitation, max. and min. temperature)
J	F	M	A	M	J	J	A	S	O	N	D
53 18 9	29 19 9	14 21 11	3.6 24 13	1.3 27 17	0 29 20	0 30 23	0.1 30 23	0.8 30 21	9.4 28 18	32 24 14	53 20 11
- █ Average max. and min. temperatures in °C
- █ Precipitation totals in mm
- Source: World Meteorological Organization
Imperial conversion
J	F	M	A	M	J	J	A	S	O	N	D
2.1 65 49	1.1 67 49	0.6 70 51	0.1 75 56	0.1 80 62	0 83 69	0 85 73	0 87 74	0 85 70	0.4 82 64	1.2 75 58	2.1 68 51
- █ Average max. and min. temperatures in °F
- █ Precipitation totals in inches

Luxor

Climate chart (precipitation, max. and min. temperature)
J	F	M	A	M	J	J	A	S	O	N	D
0 23 5	0 25 7	0 27 10	0 35 16	0 39 20	0 41 23	0 41 24	0 40 23	0 39 21	1 35 17	0 29 12	0 24 7
- █ Average max. and min. temperatures in °C
- █ Precipitation totals in mm
- Source: Climate Charts
Imperial conversion
J	F	M	A	M	J	J	A	S	O	N	D
0 73 42	0 78 45	0 81 51	0 95 61	0 103 68	0 107 73	0 106 74	0 105 74	0 102 70	0 96 63	0 84 53	0 76 45
- █ Average max. and min. temperatures in °F
- █ Precipitation totals in inches

Saint Catherine

Climate chart (precipitation, max. and min. temperature)
J	F	M	A	M	J	J	A	S	O	N	D
3 14 2	2 15 2	4 19 6	4 24 10	0 28 14	0 31 16	0 32 18	0 32 18	0 31 16	1 26 12	3 20 7	4 16 4
- █ Average max. and min. temperatures in °C
- █ Precipitation totals in mm
- Source: Climate Charts
Imperial conversion
J	F	M	A	M	J	J	A	S	O	N	D
0.1 57 35	0.1 58 36	0.2 65 42	0.2 75 50	0 82 57	0 88 61	0 90 64	0 90 64	0 87 61	0 78 54	0.1 68 45	0.2 60 39
- █ Average max. and min. temperatures in °F
- █ Precipitation totals in inches

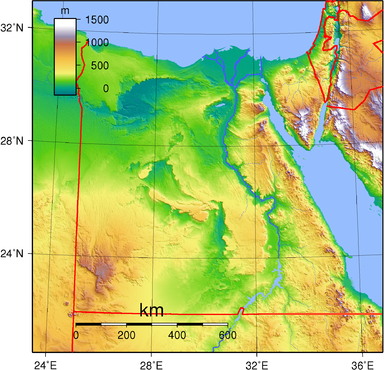
Topography map

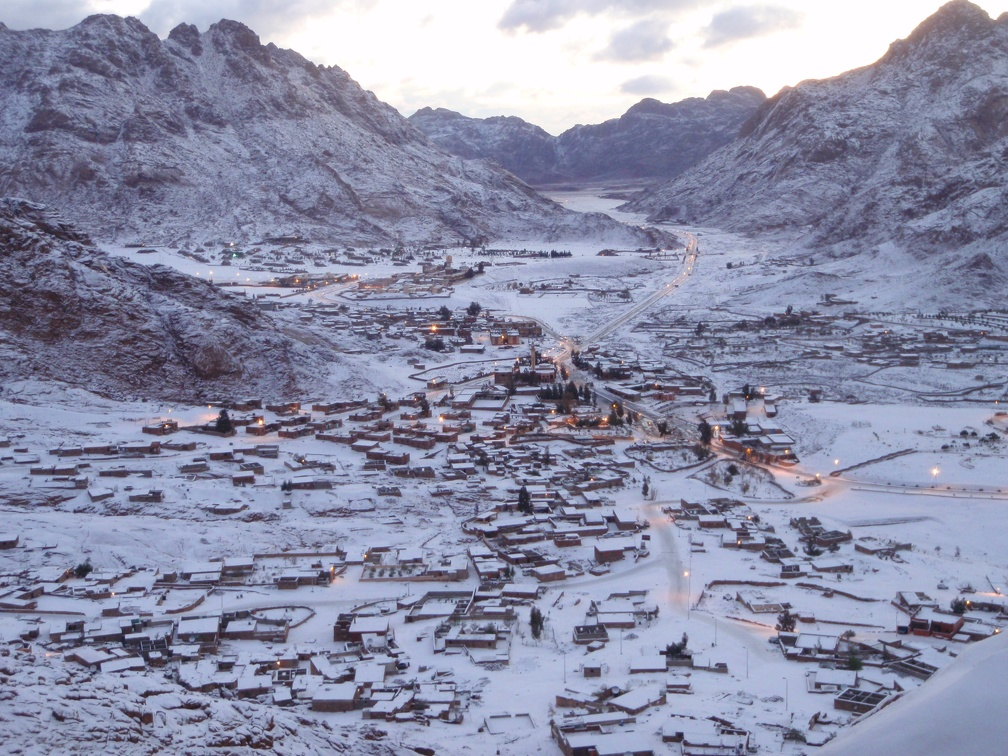
Snow in Saint Catherine, Sinai Peninsula (1 March 2009)

Notable climatic features

- Rafah and Alexandria are the wettest places
- Asyut is the driest city
- Aswan and Luxor are the cities with the hottest summer days
- Saint Catherine has the coldest nights and coldest winters

Cities or resorts with coolest summer days

- Mersa Matruh
- Port Said

Places with least temperature fluctuation

- Port Said
- Kosseir
- Ras El Bar
- Baltim
- Damietta
- Alexandria

Wettest places

- Rafah
- Alexandria
- Abu Qir
- Rosetta
- Baltim
- Kafr El Dawwar
- Mersa Matruh

Cities or resorts with warmest winter nights

- Marsa Alam
- El Qoseir
- Sharm El Sheikh

Cities with most temperature fluctuation between days and nights

- Luxor
- Minya
- Sohag
- Qena
- Asyut

== See also ==
- Geography of Egypt
- Climate change in the Middle East and North Africa
