= List of rivers of Egypt =

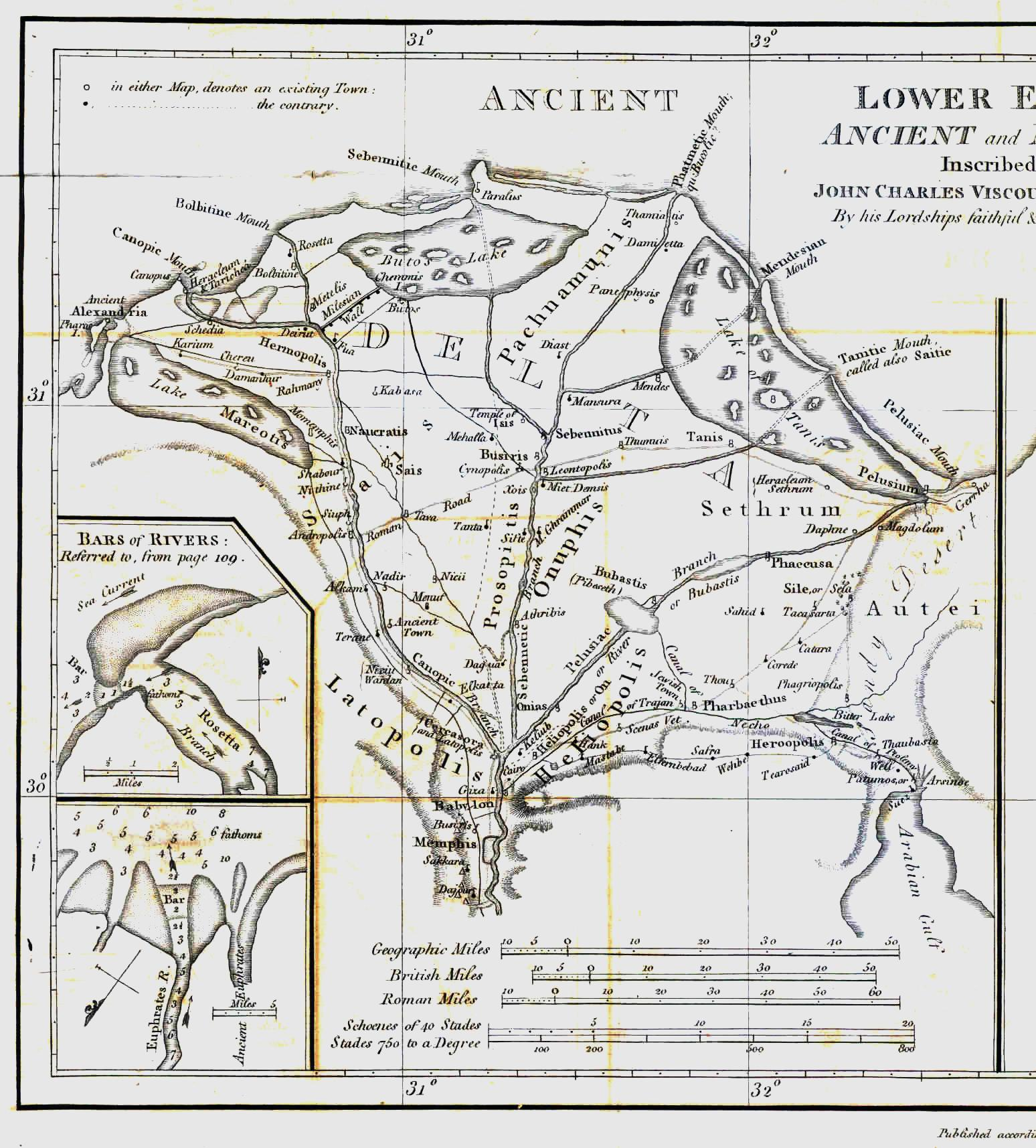
The Nile delta at the time of Herodotus, according to James Rennell (corresponding to the Phatnitic, to the east) and the Rashid (corresponding to notably the Nile, have provided water, transportation, and defense to Egypt for thousands of years.

The Nile is intersected by a number of normally dry tributaries or wadis which traverse the Eastern Desert. The wadis drain run-off rainfall from the mountains along the Egyptian Red Sea coast, though it only rarely reaches the main trunk of the wadis to flow downstream to the Nile.

The three principal wadis are:

- Wadi Abbad (drainage area 7,000 km^{2})
- Wadi Shait (length 200 km, drainage area 10,000 km^{2})
- Wadi El-Kharit (length 260 km, drainage area 23,000 km^{2})
- Sinai Peninsula has a number of wadis, including the Wadi Mukattab ("The Valley of Writing") and the Wadi Feiran (associated with the biblical Rephidim).

== See also ==
Brook of Egypt

== Sources ==
- The Vegetation of Egypt, pp. 192, 253. M. A. Zahran, A. J. Willis. Springer, 2008. ISBN 978-1-4020-8755-4
