= Nawamis =

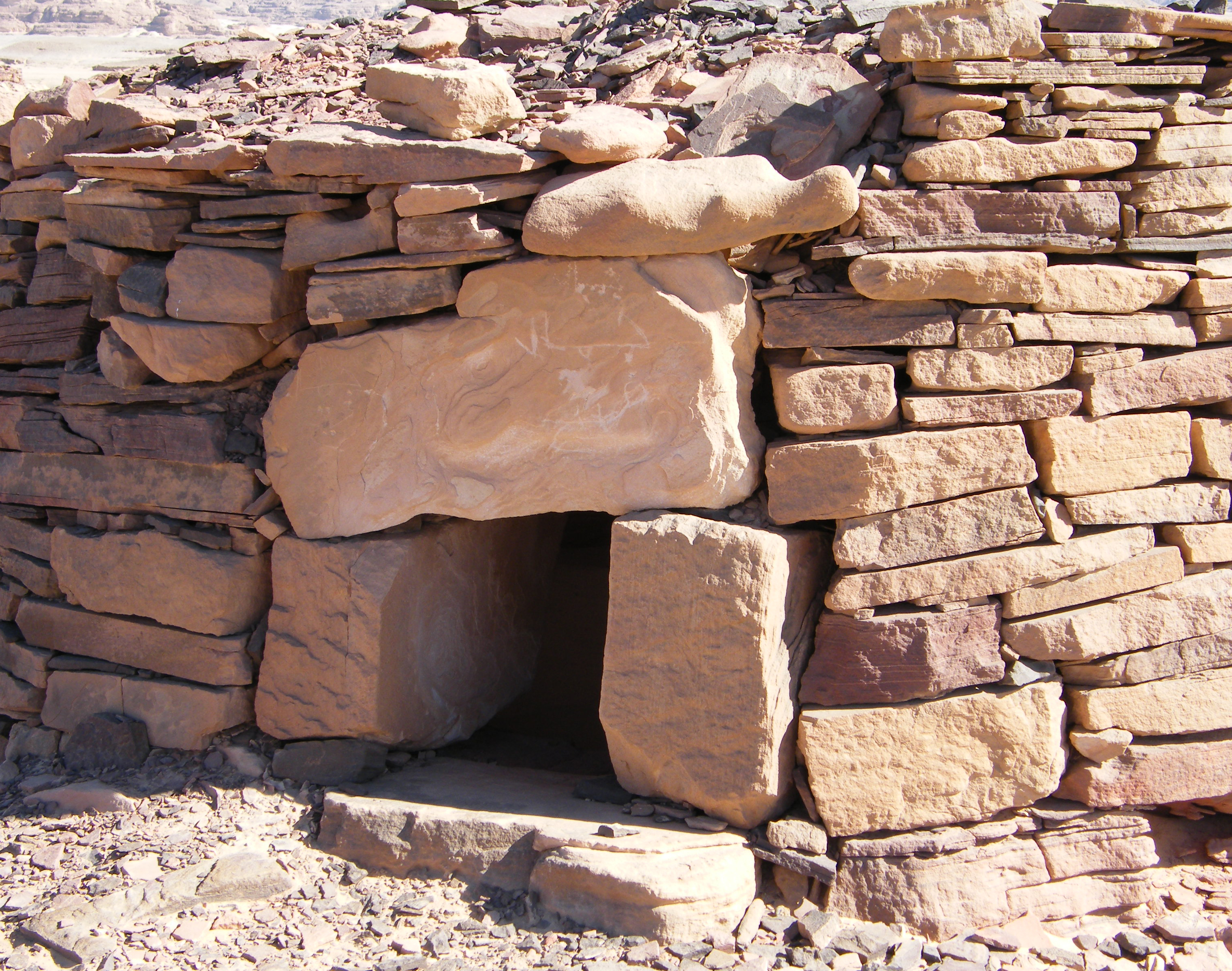
Nawamis, Egypt

Nawamis (singular: namus) are circular prehistoric megalithic stone tombs located in the Sinai Peninsula in Egypt. Sites called nawamis are also found in Oman and Yemen. Human remains found in the tombs date from 4000 to 3150 BCE, the Chalcolithic era of prehistoric Egypt and the Levant.

Nawamis are constructed from sandstone, about 2–2.5 m (6.6–8.2 ft) high and 3–6 m (9.8–19.7 ft) in diameter, and have openings facing west.

Some authorities believe the stone structures are younger than the remains.

== Location in Egypt ==
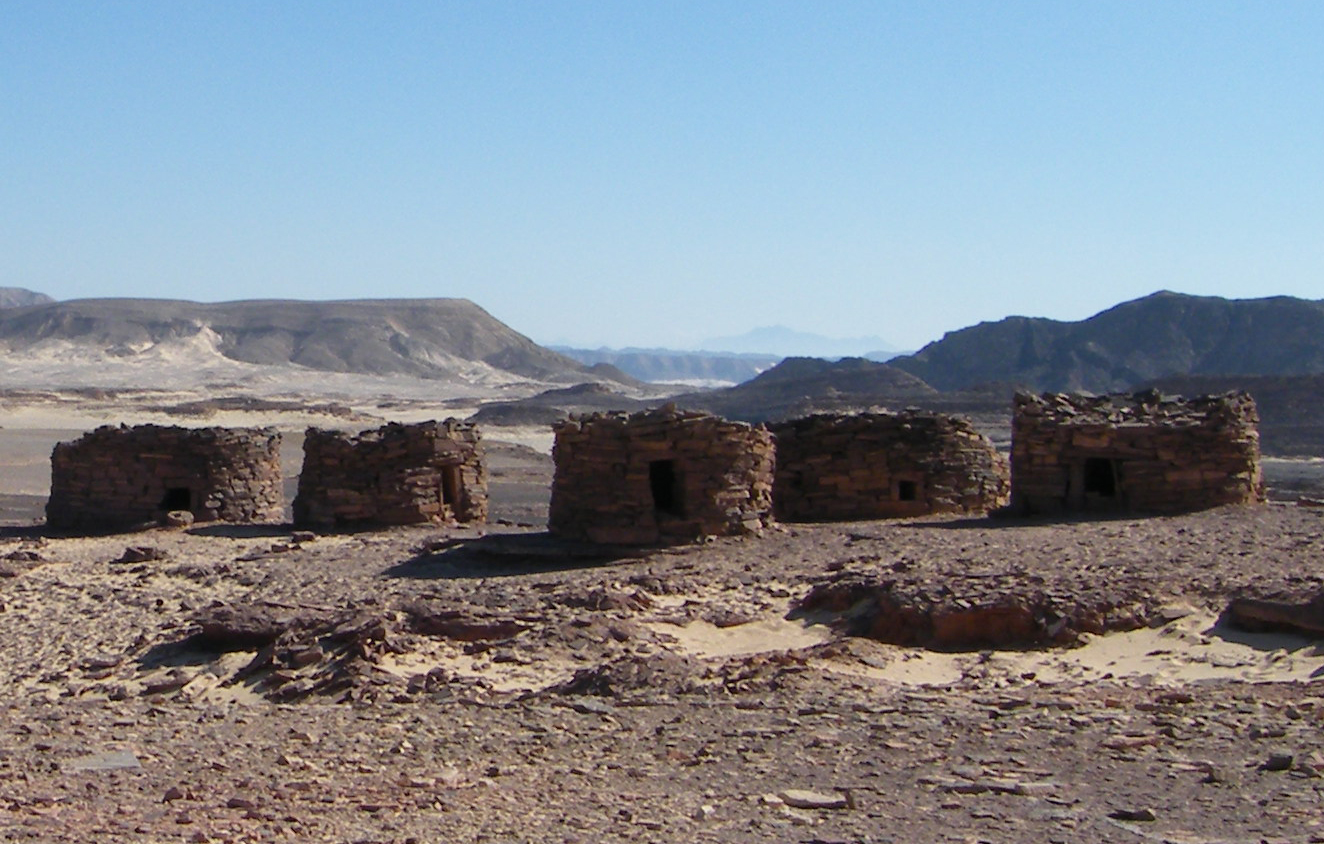
Nawamis in Sinai

There are two spots with nawamis on the road from Dahab to Saint Catherine:

- Hdhabat Chajaj nawamis, coordinates: 28.51'19.48N, 34.22'24.62E
- Al trefiya nawamis (only ruins survive).

== Nawamis in Sultanate of Oman ==
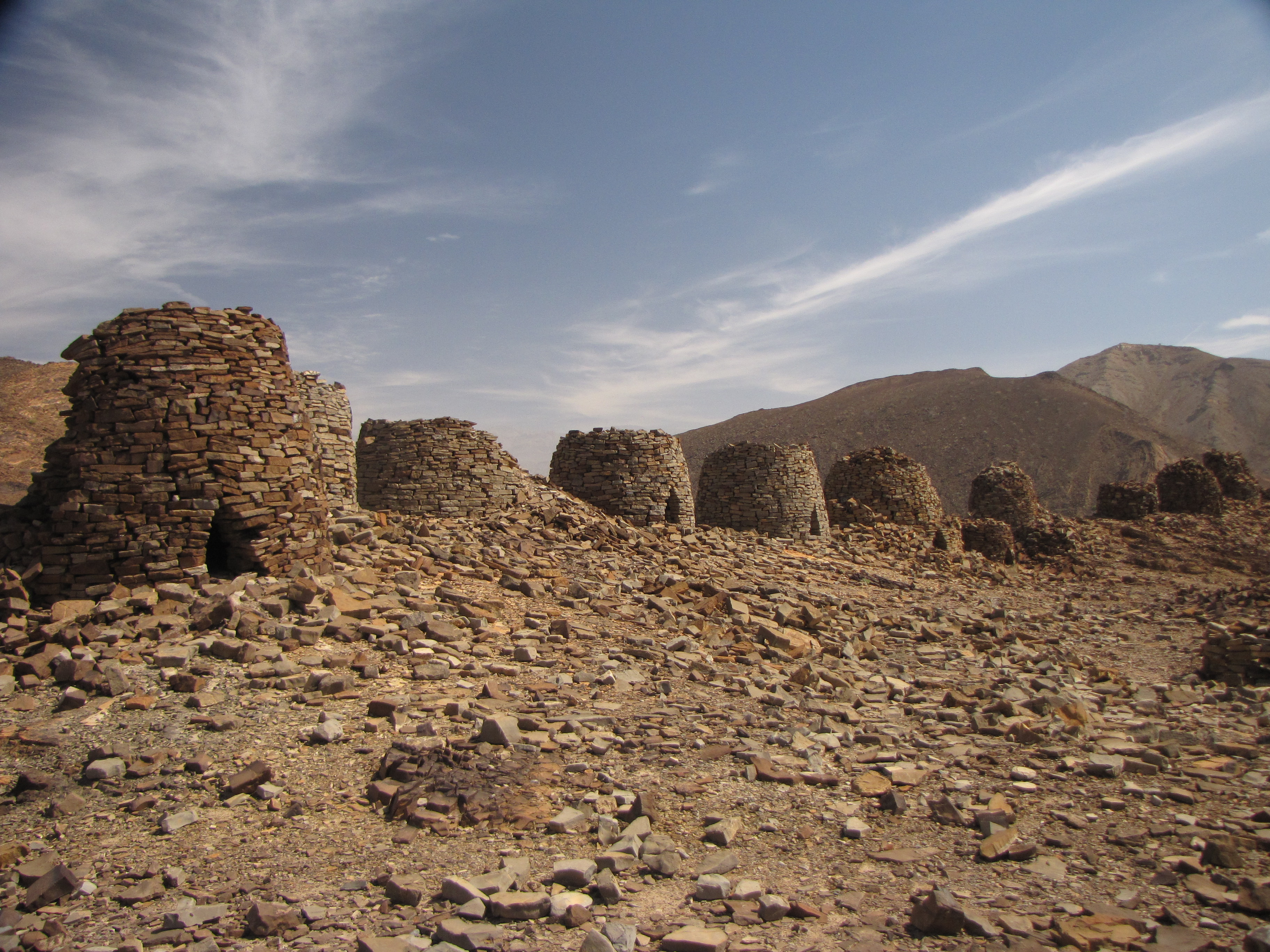
Nawamis tombs were found in the areas of Bat, al-khutm and al-Ayn in Sultanate of Oman

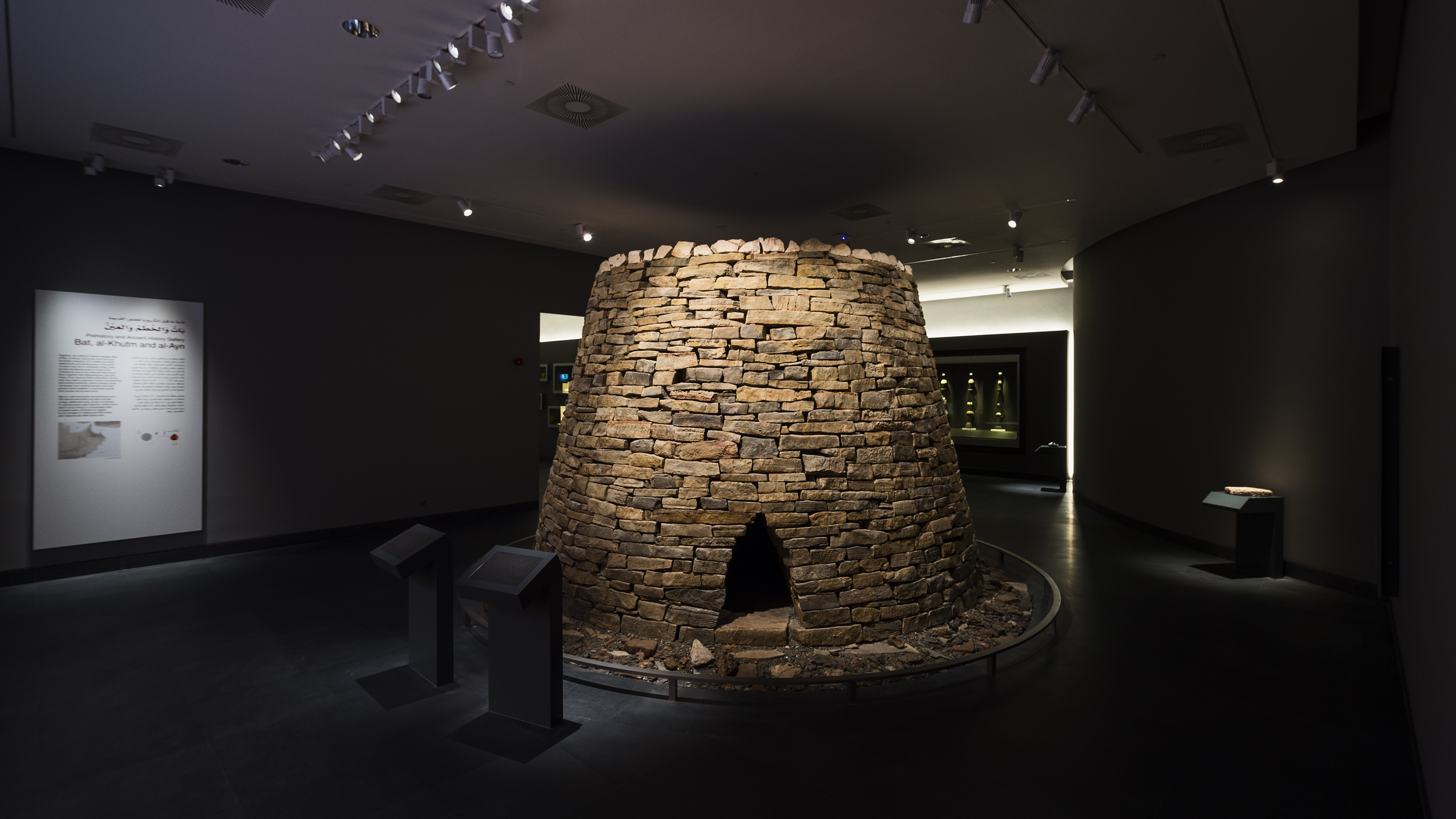
Nawamis tomb at a museum in Oman

Nawamis tombs were found in the areas of Bat, al-Khutm and al-Ayn in Oman.

== Nawamis in Yemen ==
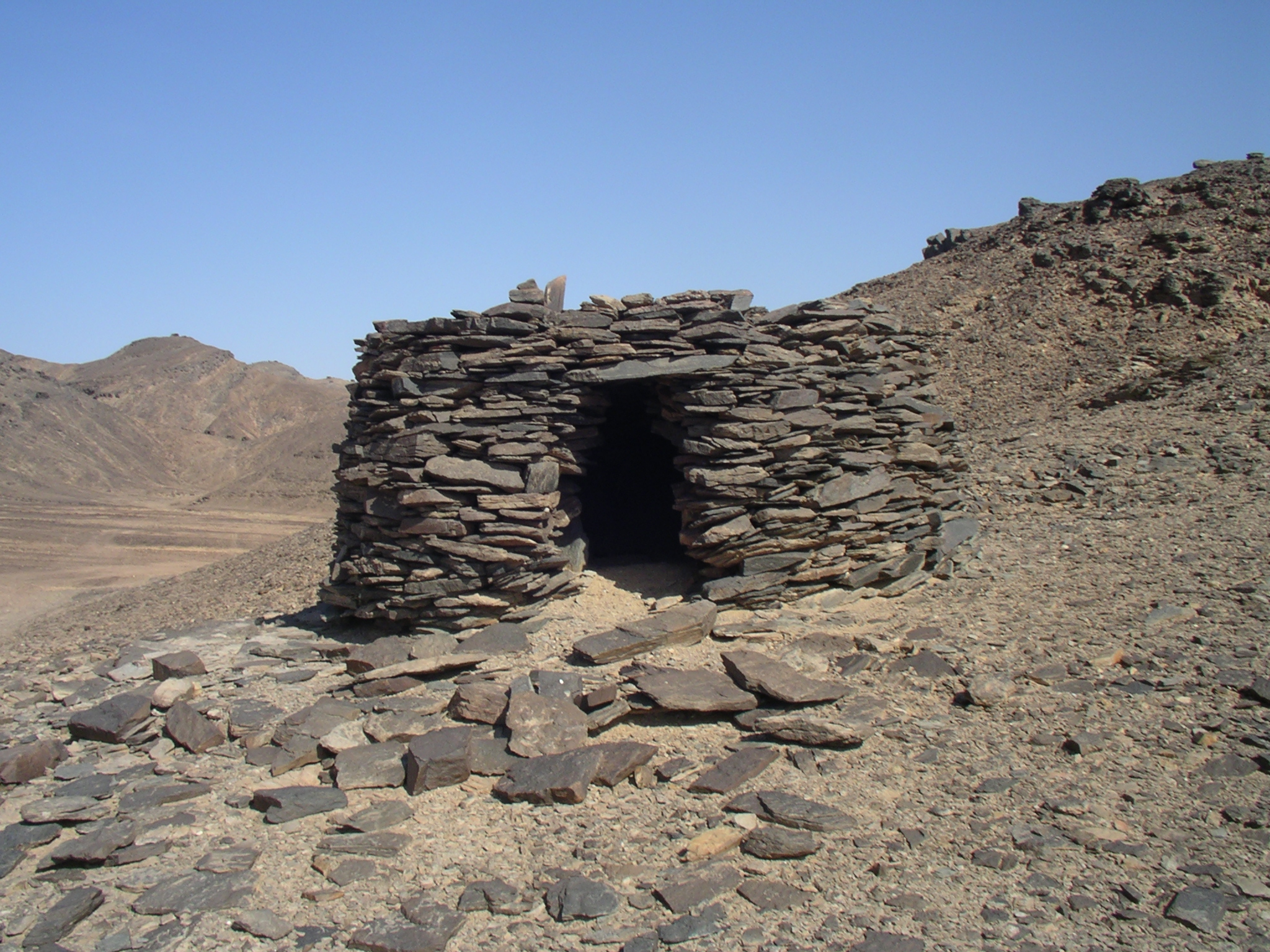
Megaliths are found in Jabal Ruwaik, Yemen

Megaliths are found in Jabal Ruwaik, Yemen.
