= Wadi Feiran =

Large valley in Sinai

Coordinates: 28.7187°N 33.6202°E

Wadi Feiran or Wadi Faran is the southern Sinai Peninsula's largest and widest wadi. It is an intermittent stream and rises from the mountains around Saint Catherine's Monastery, at 2500 m above sea level.

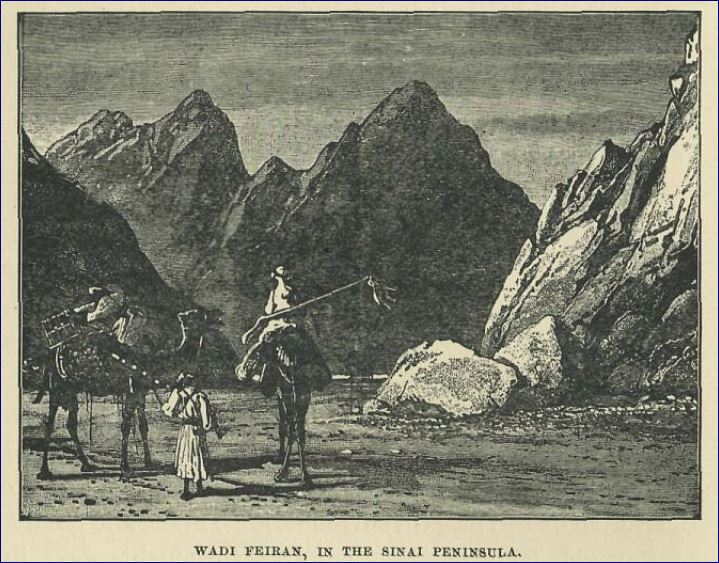

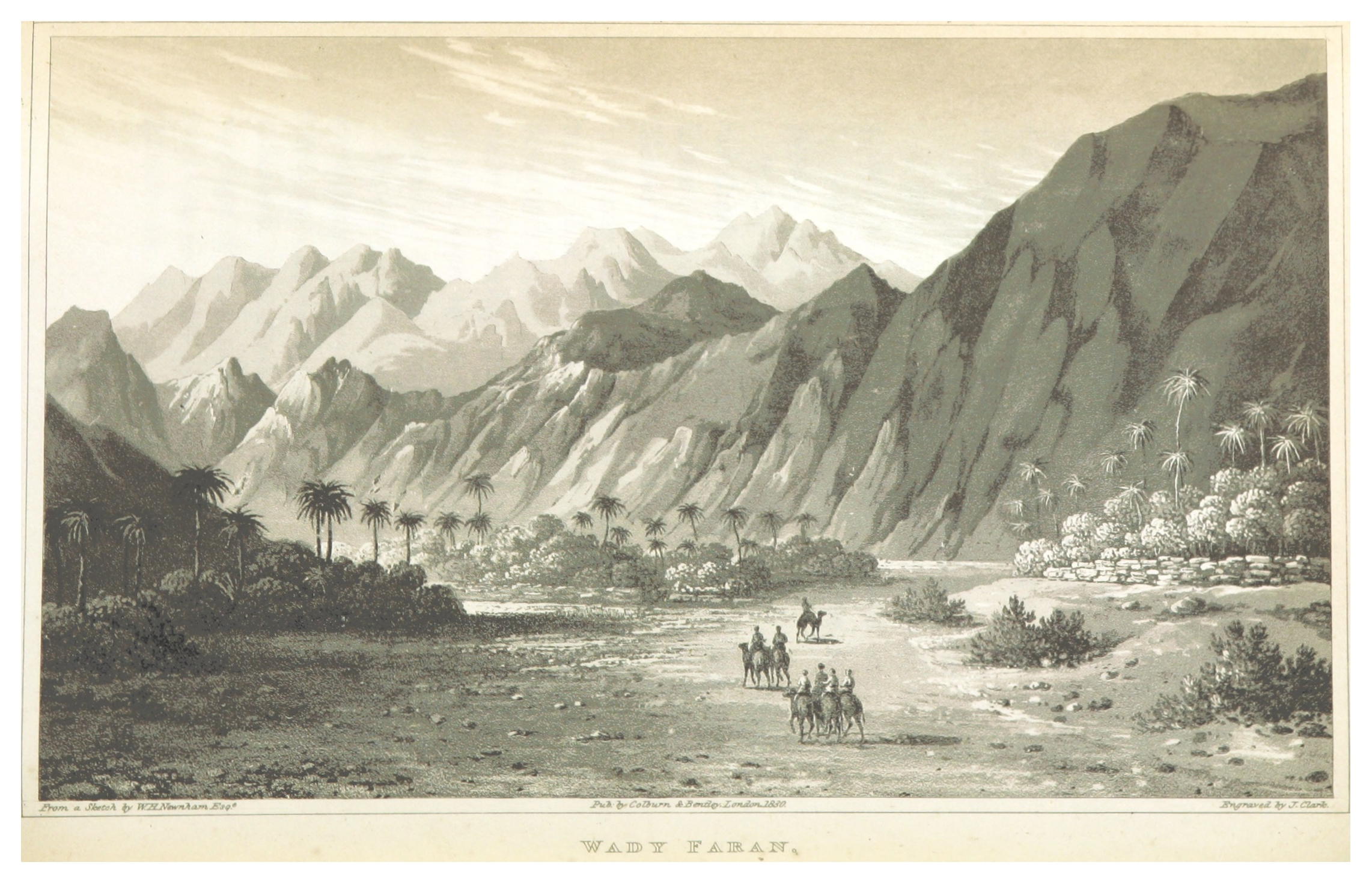
WEBSTER(1830) 2.210 Wadi Feiran

It is one of the alleged sites of Rephidim, a station of the Exodus where Moses struck a rock and caused it to spring water, allowing "his people", the Hebrews, to drink.

Wadi Feiran is an 81-mile (130 km) wadi on Egypt's Sinai Peninsula. Its upper reaches, around Jebel Musa, are known as the Wadi el-Sheikh. It empties into the Red Sea's Gulf of Suez 18 miles (29 km) southeast of Abu Zenima. Ptolemy identified the area as the site of Paran. The nearby hill is the Tell Feiran.

== Feiran Oasis ==
The Feiran Oasis, formerly known as El Hesweh, runs about 3 miles (4.8 km) of the length of the wadi, 28 miles (45 km) above its mouth.

== Bedouins of Sinai ==
The Bedouins, nomadic people who lived in goat tents but now live in stone huts, traditionally offer their hospitality to guests at Wadi Feiran and the Feiran Oasis, near Mount Sinai. The Bedouins are generally honored to offer hospitality to travelers. They may offer tea, coffee and, as recently as 2003, may have felt obligated to slaughter an animal for their guest(s). Werner Braun, a journalistic photographer, photographed the Bedouins at Wadi Ferian.

Travel guides, however, advise visitors not to wear out their welcome, reporting that Bedouin hosts believe a reasonable stay is three days: the first day is for greeting, the second day is for eating, and the third day is for speaking. By the fourth morning, the visitor who is not on his way out is as unwelcome "as the spotted snake".

Pilgrims and interested tourists come here and to nearby Saint Catherine's Monastery. For a time, a monk from Saint Catherine's also maintained a small church and farmstead at Wadi Feiran.

== See also ==
- Rivers of Egypt
- Biblical Mount Sinai
- Desert of Paran
