= Mount Catherine =

Highest mountain in Egypt

Mount Saint Catherine
- Gabal Saint Katrîne
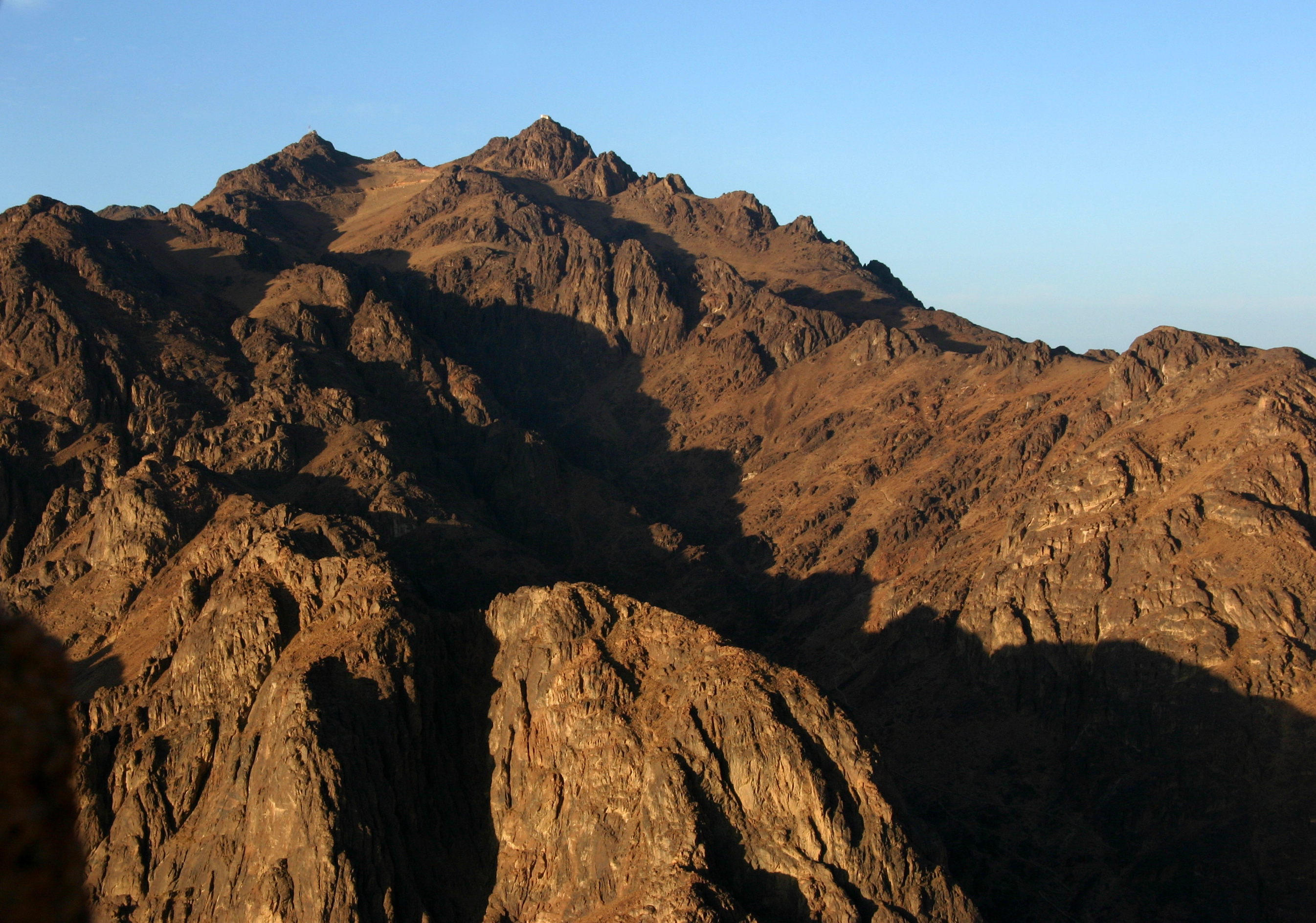
- Mount Saint Catherine as seen from the northeast. Taken from Mount Sinai.

Highest point
- Elevation: 2,653 m (8,704 ft)
- Prominence: 2,420 m (7,940 ft)
- Listing: Country high point Ultra, Ribu
- Coordinates: 28°30′34″N 33°57′20″E

Geography
- Location within Egypt
- Location: Sinai Peninsula
- Country: Egypt

Mount Catherine or Mount Saint Catherine (Arabic: جبل كاثرين; Greek: Όρος της Αγίας Αικατερίνης) is the highest mountain in Egypt. It is located near the town of Saint Catherine in the South Sinai Governorate. It is also known as Gebel Katherina.

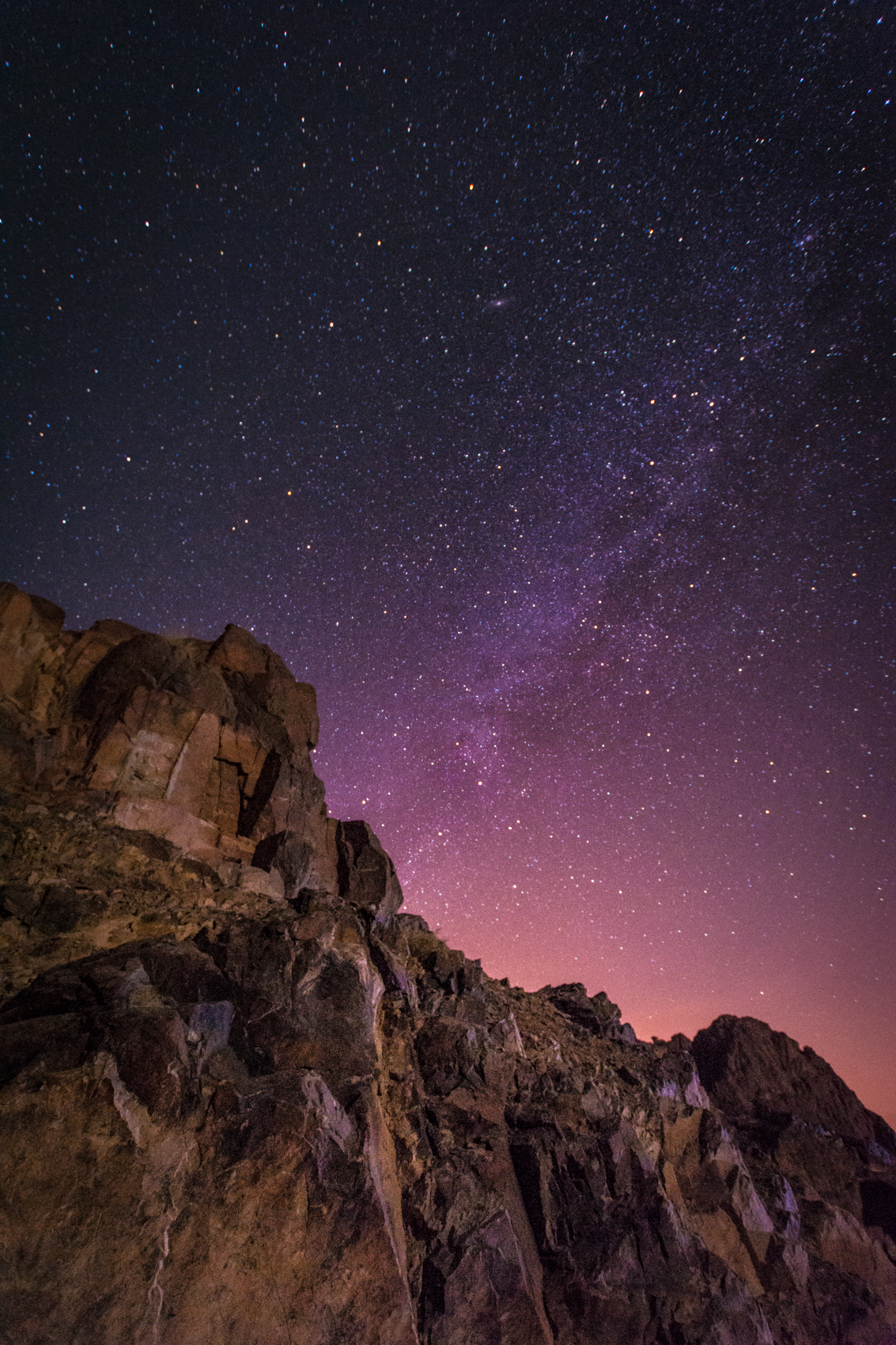
Mount Catherine rocks

The name is derived from the Christian tradition that angels transported to this mountain the body of the martyred Saint Catherine of Alexandria.

At the summit of the mountain, there is a chapel built in 1905 and a meteorological station.

== History ==
=== Archaeology ===
In January 2020, archaeologists working north of Mount Catherine uncovered a cave with paintings of people and animals in red pigment that dates back to the Chalcolithic period (c. 5th–4th millennium BC). According to Egyptologist John Darnell, red painted images are not as common as engraved images and text. The painting resembling a camel shows that at least some of the graffiti are not older than the first millennium BC and may belong to a later period. The cave was filled with graffiti from different periods over time.

== Geology ==
Mount Saint Catherine is a large horst that rose in a vertical movement along the length of the Wadi Sabia fault in the Catherine Plateau during the Neogene period. The Catherine Plateau consists of different volcanic rocks that were formed at different times in the Precambrian era. These rocks include, among others: tuff, agglomerate, volcanic bombs and lava flows. The volcanic rocks in this area have experienced significant cracking and weathering, leading to the formation of extensive screes, leading to increased water infiltration and subsequently impacting the local water regime.

== Climate ==
Precipitation is infrequent and sporadic, with occasional snowfall occurring on the summit. During the winter season, at the mountain's uppermost reaches, typical conditions include an average maximum temperature of 5 °C or 41.0 °F and an average minimum temperature of −3 °C or 26.6 °F.

In summer, the average maximum temperature is 23 °C or 73.4 °F and the average minimum temperature is 12 °C or 53.6 °F. The average daily amplitude between temperatures is about 10 °C or 18 °F.

== Vegetation ==
The snowfall on the mountain summits primarily infiltrates the screes, making it contribute minimally to the available water supply. Consequently, the mountain's vegetation is dominated by plants adapted to arid conditions. Within the mountainous region, various plant species thrive, including Artemisia herba-alba (mainly in the wadis), Zilla spinosa, and Atraphaxis. Agathophora grows on the exposed, windswept slopes, while Tanacetum santolinoides is commonly found in proximity to rocky surfaces. In Wadi Shaq Musa, which descends from the mountain, there is a concentration of Primula.

== Christian tradition ==
According to Christian tradition, Saint Catherine was tortured and killed in Alexandria by the Roman emperor Maxentius, at the beginning of the third century. She was executed because she refused to renounce her Christian faith.

According to one legend angels placed her body on top of the mountain, where it was discovered by a monk.

== See also ==
- Saint Catherine's Monastery
- Mount Sinai
- List of ultras of Africa
- List of ultras of West Asia
- List of elevation extremes by country
