= Saint Katherine Protectorate =

Egyptian national park in the south of Sinai

Coordinates: 28°33′N 33°58′E

St Katherine Protectorate is an Egyptian national park in the south of Sinai. It encloses most of the mountainous area of central South Sinai, including the country's highest mountain, Mount Catherine at 2,629 metres (8,625 ft) above sea level.

In 2002, a 640 km^{2} area demarcated by the ‘Ring Dykke’ within the Protectorate core was listed by UNESCO as a World Heritage Site. The listed area includes the highest mountains in the Protectorate, including Mount Sinai and the Saint Catherine's Monastery. In September 2001 a delegation from ICOMOS (International Council on Monuments and Sites) conducted a site review and the site and their recommendations are included in the listing memorandum. A site visit by IUCN, the administrative agency for Natural Sites, was conducted in December 2002. It was proposed that the site be redesignated as ‘An Associative Cultural Landscape’. World Heritage status brings higher protection and international oversight but entails a more intensive management effort and full cooperation from local and national authorities.

== Climate ==
It is normal for temperatures to reach 30 °C or 86 °F in summer midday with a moderate climate at night. Meanwhile, it is common for mountain peaks to be visible during winter with temperatures ranging between averages of 10 to 16 °C (50.0 to 60.8 °F) around midday. Winter temperatures normally drop below freezing at night and reach −14 °C or 6.8 °F at the top of the mountains. Visitors are advised to wear appropriate warm clothing if they are climbing the touristic, historic Mount Sinai at night, particularly during winter.

== Primary management goals ==
1. The conservation of the contained mountain ecosystem of Southern Sinai including all its elements and processes and the conservation of the site’s traditional cultural and religious values.

2. To facilitate and strengthen the institutional capacity for Protectorate management and development in partnership with relevant institutions and local stakeholders.

3. The integration of the St Katherine Protectorate management and development planning into the network of protected areas forming the South Sinai Management Sector.

4. The integration of the protectorate into the local development process and land use management system in order to assist sustainable local rural development.

== Ecological importance ==
This arid, mountain ecosystem supports biodiversity, including a high proportion of plant endemics. Its high-altitude ecosystem supports a diversity of endangered wild flora and wildlife; some found nowhere else in the world. Around 472 plant species are found at Saint Katherine Protectorate, out of which 115 are of medicinal importance and 19 are endemic to Egypt. To date 27 mammal species have been recorded, 9 of which are bats. There are 46 reptile species, where 15 of which are found nowhere else in Egypt.

== Natural resources ==
Medicinal plants, pastoral plants, wildlife, groundwater, granite, marble, and building materials, introduced fruitful trees such as palm trees, figs, olives, and almonds.

== Local communities ==
The protectorate is home to 7,000 Egyptian Bedouin citizens from six different tribes who play a very vital role in managing the protectorate with their invaluable traditional knowledge about the area and its natural characteristics. Around the monastery, you will find the Bedouins of the Gabalia tribe who have played a very important role in the building and protection of the monastery since they were brought from Macedonia for that particular purpose in the sixth century. Throughout the years the newcomers became Bedouins with very close relations with the monks which proved mutually beneficial for the two sides.

== Protectorate legislation ==
1. Law 102/1983

The main Protectorate legislative instrument, Law 102 sets out the principles for the declaration of natural protectorates and stipulates development restrictions and activities within and adjacent to the protectorate. The Law obliges the EEAA as the concerned administrative body to:

- Forbid actions leading to the destruction or deterioration of the natural environment, biota or which would detract from the aesthetic standards of the protectorate.
- Regulate scientific research
- Develop a management program for declared protected areas
- Increase public awareness
- Regulate recreational activities in protectorates to protect natural resources

2. Law 4/1994

Prohibits the hunting, possession, transport, and sale of those species of wild fauna (live or dead) determined by Executive Statues of same Law.
