= Shih =

Shih is the Wade–Giles equivalent of Shi in Chinese. It may refer to:

- Shi (poetry) (詩/诗), a term for Chinese poetry
- Shí (surname), the romanization of several Chinese surnames
- Shi (class) (士), the low aristocratic class of Shang/Zhou China, later the scholar-gentry class of imperial China
- Shi (personator) (尸), a ceremonial "corpse" involved in early forms of ancestor worship in China
- Posthumous name (諡), a traditional East Asian honorary name
- Shih (市), various administrative divisions generally translated "city" on Taiwan and in mainland China
- Shih (時), a traditional Chinese unit of time equal to two hours
- Shih, transliteration of Chinese Radical 44
- Shih (composer) or Shih Chieh, Taiwanese-Austrian composer

== See also ==
- Shi (disambiguation)
