= Shi =

Shi or SHI may refer to:

== Language ==
- Shi, a Japanese title commonly used as a pronoun
- Shi, proposed gender-neutral pronoun
- Shi (kana), a kana in Japanese syllabaries
- Shi language, a Bantu language spoken in the Democratic Republic of the Congo
- Shī, transliteration of Chinese Radical 44
- Tachelhit or the Shilha language (ISO 639 code), a Berber language spoken in Morocco

== Art ==
- Shi, a piece in Chinese chess
- Shi (character), a comic book character created by writer/illustrator William Tucci
- Shi (poetry), the Chinese conception of poetry
- Poetry (film) or Shi, a 2010 South Korean film directed by Lee Chang-dong

== People ==
- Shi (class) (士), the low aristocratic class of Shang/Zhou China, later the scholar-gentry class of imperial China
- Shi (rank) (士), rank group for non-commissioned officers
- Shi (personator) (尸), a ceremonial "corpse" involved in early forms of ancestor worship in China

=== Names ===
- Shì (氏), a Chinese clan name previously distinguished from ancestral or family names; see Origin of Chinese surnames
- Shī (surname), the romanization of the Chinese surname 施
- Shí (surname), the romanization of the Chinese surname 石
- Shǐ (surname), the romanization of the Chinese surname 史
- Shì (surname), the romanization of the Chinese surname 士
- Shí (surname 時), the romanization of the Chinese surname 時
- Posthumous name (諡), a traditional East Asian honorary name

== Acronym ==
- Samsung Heavy Industries, a Korean shipbuilding and offshore EPC company
- Sumitomo Heavy Industries, a Japanese integrated manufacturer of industrial machinery, automatic weaponry, ships, bridges and steel structure, equipment for environmental protection company
- Statutory health insurance, or national health insurance
- Stolen Horse International, American organization helping to recover stolen horses

== Mathematics ==
- Shi, hyperbolic sine integral

== Units ==
- Shí or shichen, a traditional Chinese unit of time equal to two hours
- Shì (市), various administrative divisions generally translated "city" in mainland China, on Taiwan, and in Japan

== Cuisine ==
- Shchi or "schi", a classic traditional Russian soup
- Shi, the colloquial term for a family of fermented soybeans in Chinese cuisine

== Astronomy ==
- Shì (室) or Encampment, a Chinese constellation
- Shǐ (屎), the Chinese name of the star Mu Columbae

== Other ==
- SHI International Corp, an American information technology company
- Shi Islet (獅嶼), Lieyu Township, Kinmen County, Fujian, Republic of China (Taiwan)
- SHI, the Chapman code for Shetland, UK
- SHI, the IATA code for Shimojishima Airport in the Okinawa Prefecture, Japan
- SHI, the National Rail code for Shiplake railway station in the county of Oxfordshire, UK

== See also ==
- Shíshī, stone Chinese guardian lions
- "Shī Shì shí shī shǐ", the "Lion-Eating Poet in the Stone Den", a tongue twister
- Xi (disambiguation)
- Shishi (disambiguation)
- She (disambiguation)
