= Chichi =

Chichi or Chichí may refer to:

== Given name ==
- Chichi Letswalo, South African television actress and presenter
- Chichi Ojei, Nigerian politician
- Chichi Menakaya, Nigerian trauma and orthopedic surgeon based in the United Kingdom
- Chichi Eburu Nigerian‑American entrepreneur

== Nickname ==
- Chichi Creus, Spanish former professional basketball player, coach and executive
- Chichí Peralta, Dominican musician, songwriter, composer and producer
- Chichi Scholl, American tennis player
- Chichi Vanessa, Nigerian-South African beauty pageant titleholder

== Places ==
- Chichi (village) or Çiçi, in the Quba Rayon of Azerbaijan
- Chichi Township, China

== Other ==
- Stellio Capo Chichi, Pan-Africanist political leader, activist, writer
- Uncle Chichi, the unofficial world's oldest dog from December 2011 until his death

== See also ==
- Chi-Chi (disambiguation)
