= Chee-Chee =

Chee-Chee or Chee Chee may refer to:

- Chee-Chee, a monkey character in the Doctor Dolittle series of children's books
- Chee-Chee, an ethnic slur against an Anglo-Indian or person of mixed Eurasian descent; also a reference to English spoken with a South Asian accent
- Chee-Chee and Peppy, an American teen R&B vocal duo in the early 1970s
- Frank DeMayo (1885-1949?), Missouri mobster nicknamed "Chee-Chee"
- Rose Murphy (1913–1989), an American jazz pianist and singer known as "the chee chee girl"
- Benjamin Chee Chee (1944-1977), Ojibwa-Canadian artist
- Chee-Chee (musical), a 1928 Broadway musical by Richard Rodgers and Lorenz Hart

== See also ==
- Chi-Chi (disambiguation)
- "Chee Chee-Oo Chee (Sang the Little Bird)", a 1955 song
