= Hers =

Hers or HERS may refer to:

- The possessive pronoun version of she
- Her's, an English rock band from Liverpool
- Hers (album), 2025 album by Matt Maltese
- "Hers" (Justin Timberlake song)
- Hers-Vif (or simply Hers), a river in southern France
- Hers-Mort, a river in southern France
- Hertwig's epithelial root sheath
- Energy rating systems:
  - Home Energy Rating, in the United States
  - House Energy Rating, in Australia

== People with the surname ==
- François Hers (born 1943), Belgian photographer and artist
- Henri G. Hers (1923–2008), Belgian scientist
- Joseph Hers (1884–1965), Belgian railroad engineer and botanist

== See also ==
- Her (disambiguation)
- His and Hers (disambiguation)
