= Shí (surname) =

Shi
- Shi surname in regular script
- Pronunciation: Shí (Mandarin Pinyin); Shih2 (Mandarin Wade-Giles); Sek6 (Cantonese Jyutping); Sehk6 (Cantonese Yale); Shek6 (Cantonese Wade-Giles)
- Language: Chinese

Origin
- Language: Old Chinese
- Meaning: “stone”

Other names
- Variant forms: Shi, Shih (Mandarin); Sek, Sehk (Cantonese)

Shí ([ʂɻ̩̌]) or Shih is the romanization of the Chinese surname 石. It means "stone." It was one of the "Nine Sogdian Surnames." A 2013 study found it was the 63rd most common surname, shared by 4,550,000 people or 0.340% of the population, with Henan being the province with the most people.

It should not be confused with Shí (surname 時), a rarer surname meaning "time."

== Romanisation variation ==
Due to the use of different romanisation systems over time, different Romanised variants of the surname are used.

Surname	Romanisation	Region	Language
Shi	Pinyin	Mainland China	Mandarin Chinese
Shih	Wade–Giles	Taiwan Area	Mandarin Chinese
Shek	Wade–Giles	Guangdong	Cantonese
Sek	Jyutping	Guangdong	Cantonese
Sehk	Yale romanization of Cantonese	Guangdong	Cantonese

== Notable people ==
- Domee Shi (石之予, Shí Zhīyǔ), Chinese-born Canadian animator, director and screenwriter
- Shi Baoyuan (石寶源), Chinese general
- Jenny Cheok Cheng Kid (石清菊 shí qīngjǘ), Singaporean bar waitress and murder victim
- Howard S.H. Shyr (石世豪), Chairperson of National Communications Commission of the Republic of China (2012–2016)
- Jeffrey "Trump" Shih (石謙和), American Hearthstone player
- Shi Feng (石峰), Chinese swimmer, who competed for China at the 2008 Summer Olympics in Beijing.
- Shi Hanqing (Chinese: 石汉青), Chinese pool player and former professional snooker player
- Shi Hongjun (石鸿俊), Chinese footballer
- Shi Ke (石柯), Chinese footballer
- Shi Le (石勒), a Later Zhao ruler from among the Jie
- Shi Shen (石申), a Wei astronomer
- Shi Shouxin (石守信), a military general in imperial China, first serving the Later Zhou during the last years of the Five Dynasties and Ten Kingdoms period
- Shi Xiaotian (石笑天), Chinese footballer
- Shi Xin Hui (石欣卉), a Malaysian singer, who was one of the five popular new talents emerged from the Channel U's popular singing talent show, Project Superstar 2005 in Singapore
- Shi Yao (石瑶), Chinese female ice hockey goaltender
- Shi Yaolong (石曜隆), Chinese bobsledder
- Shi Zhiyong (weightlifter, born 1980) (石智勇), Chinese weightlifter, Olympic Champion during the 2004 Summer Olympics
- Shi Zhiyong (weightlifter, born 1993) (石智勇), Chinese weightlifter, Olympic Champion during the 2016 Summer Olympics
- Shi Zongyuan (石宗源), ethnic Hui, was a politician of the People's Republic of China
- Shih Chia-hsin (施佳鍟), Taiwanese mayor
- Shih Chih-wei (石志偉), Taiwanese former baseball player
- Shih Kien (石堅), Hong Kong-based Chinese actor
- Shih Su-mei (石素梅), Taiwanese politician, Minister of the Directorate-General of Budget, Accounting and Statistics (2008–2016)

== See also ==
- Shi (disambiguation)
