= Shishi =

Shishi or shi shi may refer to:

== People ==
- Empress Shi (fl. 23), or Shi Shi (史氏; "Woman Shi")
- Shi Shi (emperor) (339–349), emperor of Later Zhao in 349
- Shi Shi (Taiwanese singer) (Sun Sheng Xi, born 1990)
- Li Shishi (1062–1127), a Chinese Song dynasty female singer
- Li Shishi (politician) (born 1953), a Chinese politician
- Liu Shishi (born 1987), a Chinese actress and ballerina
- Shishi Bunroku (1893–1969), Japanese writer and theater director
- Shishi Masaru (born 1997), Ukrainian professional sumo wrestler

== Places in China ==
- Shishi, Fujian (石狮市)
- Shishi, Hengyang (石市镇), Hengyang County, Hunan

== Other uses ==
- Chinese guardian lions, also known as a shishi
- Shishi (Japan), Japanese political activists of the late Edo period
- Shi Shi (giant panda) (c. 1970s – 2008)
- Shishi (TV program) an Israeli news and current affairs program
- Sichuan Chengdu Shishi High School, in Chengdu, Sichuan, China
- Shishi Ranger, of the Dairangers from Gosei Sentai Dairanger

== See also ==
- Chi-Chi (disambiguation)
- Shi (disambiguation)
- Shishi-odoshi, Japanese devices made to scare away animals
- Lion-Eating Poet in the Stone Den (pinyin: Shī Shì shí shī shǐ), homophonic poem by Yuen Ren Chao
