= Shi Xie =

Chinese military general and warlord (137–226)

- 士燮

General of the Guards (衛將軍)
- In office after 220 – 226
- Monarch: Emperor Da of Wu

General of the Left (左將軍)
- In office 210 – 220
- Monarch: Emperor Xian of Han

General Who Stabilises Distant Lands (安遠將軍)
- In office ?–?
- Monarch: Emperor Xian of Han

General of the Household Who Pacifies the South (綏南中郎將)
- In office ?–?
- Monarch: Emperor Xian of Han

Administrator of Jiaozhi (交趾太守)
- In office 187 – ?
- Monarchs: Emperor Ling of Han / Emperor Xian of Han

Personal details
- Born: 137 Cangwu County, Guangxi, Eastern Han dynasty
- Died: 226 (aged 89) Guangzhou, Guangdong, Eastern Wu dynasty
- Relations: see here
- Children: see here
- Parent: Shi Ci (father)
- Occupation: Military general, politician, warlord
- Courtesy name: Weiyan (威彥)
- Peerage: Marquis of Longbian (龍編侯)
- Posthumous name: Thiện Cảm Gia Ứng Linh Vũ Đại Vương (善感嘉應靈武大王) (awarded by the Trần dynasty of Vietnam)

Shi Xie (137–226), courtesy name Weiyan or Ngạn Uy in Vietnamese, also rendered as Sĩ Nhiếp in Vietnamese, was a Chinese military general, politician, and warlord who lived during the Eastern Han dynasty and early Three Kingdoms period of China. He served as the Administrator of Jiaozhi Commandery in present-day northern Vietnam. The third-century historical text Records of the Three Kingdoms (Sanguozhi) is a major source of Chinese traditions concerning Shi Xie's life. He promoted Buddhism throughout his life. After his death, the Vietnamese attached many legends to him and honoured him as Sĩ Vương (King Sĩ, 士王) in some temples.

== Family background and early life ==
Shi Xie was in the sixth generation from his ancestors who migrated to northern Vietnam, born in Jiao Province, but his ancestral home was based in the Lu state which was around present-day Tai'an, Shandong. His ancestors moved to Jiao Province when Wang Mang usurped the throne and established the Xin dynasty (9–23) with himself as its emperor. Shi Xie's father, Shi Ci (士賜), served as the Administrator of Rinan Commandery (日南郡) during the reign of Emperor Huan (r. 146–168) of the Eastern Han dynasty. The Shi family was one of the elite families of Han Chinese origin who later emigrated to present-day Vietnam and played a major role in developing Vietnamese civilisation.

In his youth, Shi Xie studied in Luoyang and learned the Zuo Zhuan under the tutelage of Liu Tao (劉陶) from Yingchuan Commandery (潁川郡), later developing his own annotations to the text. Later, he was nominated as a xiaolian (civil service candidate) and served in the Han central government as a Gentleman of Writing (尚書郎) but was later dismissed because of "official reasons". After his father's death, he was nominated as a maocai (茂才) and was appointed as the Prefect of Wu County (巫縣; present-day Wushan County, Chongqing).

== As a warlord in Jiao Province ==
In 187 (Note: Shi Xie's biography in Sanguozhi recorded that he was in Jiaozhi for over 40 years (燮在郡四十馀岁), while his biography in Đại Việt sử ký toàn thư recorded that he reigned for 40 years.), the Han central government reassigned him to be the Administrator (太守) of Jiaozhi Commandery (交趾郡) in Jiao Province.

During the reign of Emperor Xian, Zhu Fu (朱符) had been appointed by the Han government to serve as the Inspector of Jiao Province. However, in 200, the locals in Jiao Province rebelled and killed him after he attempted to extract heavier taxes from them. The Han government then sent Zhang Jin (張津) to replace him, but Zhang Jin bore a grudge against Liu Biao, the Governor of Jing Province, so he raised troops to attack Liu Biao every year. Zhang Jin (Note: According to the Book of Jin, Zhang Jin was Inspector of Jiao Province when he was promoted to Governor (交州牧) in 203.) was later murdered by his subordinate Ou Jing (區景). When Liu Biao heard about this, he appointed Lai Gong (賴恭) as the new Inspector of Jiao Province without authorisation from the Han central government. At the same time, he also sent his subordinate Wu Ju (吳巨) to replace the deceased Shi Huang (史璜) as the Administrator of Cangwu Commandery (蒼梧郡). To counter Liu Biao's attempts to extend his influence into Jiao Province, the Han central government issued an imperial decree appointing Shi Xie as General of the Household Who Pacifies the South (綏南中郎將) and putting him in charge of the seven commanderies in Jiao Province. As Jiao's inspector Zhu Fu was killed, Shi Xie requested the Han dynasty to appoint his younger brothers to held important positions in Jiao Province: Shi Yi (士壹), Shi Wei (士䵋) and Shi Wu (士武) were respectively the Administrators of Hepu (合浦), Jiuzhen (九真) and Nanhai (南海) commanderies in Jiao Province. Shi Xie soon proved himself to be a great and benevolent governor, who was deeply respected and even referred to as a 'king' by all the residents. His commanderies also attract hundreds of scholars from the Han dynasty amid the on-going political crisis in the empire.

After Shi Xie sent his subordinate Zhang Min (張旻) to thank the Han central government and pay tribute in 207, the Han central government further promoted him to General Who Stabilises Distant Lands (安遠將軍), in addition to enfeoffing him as the Marquis of Longdu Village (龍度亭侯). Around the time, the Han Empire was in a state of chaos, as various warlords fought for power and territories in northern and central China. Jiao Province, being a remote province in southern China, was not caught up in the chaos. Shi Xie was effectively a warlord in control of Jiao Province even though he was still a nominal subject of the Han Empire.

Around this time, Wu Ju got into conflict with Lai Gong and forced him out of Jiao Province. Sun Quan, the warlord who controlled the territories in the Jiangdong region bordering Jiao Province, appointed his subordinate Bu Zhi as the Inspector of Jiao Province to replace Lai Gong. Shi Xie led his followers to submit to Bu Zhi's governorship, while Wu Ju pretended to cooperate with Bu Zhi and harboured ill intentions. However, Bu Zhi sensed Wu Ju's intentions and managed to outwit and kill him. Sun Quan later appointed Shi Xie as General of the Left (左將軍) to honour him. In 210, the warlord Cao Cao, who controlled the Han central government, wanted to gain Shi Xie's support as an ally against Sun Quan, so he conferred the nine bestowments and other honours on Shi Xie in the name of Emperor Xian (the figurehead Han emperor under Cao Cao's control).

== As a vassal of Eastern Wu ==
In the years after the fall of the Eastern Han dynasty in 220, Sun Quan declared himself king and established the kingdom (later empire) of Eastern Wu. (Note: Sun Quan stopped his vassalage to Cao Wei in 222 and crowned himself emperor in 229.) Shi Xie pledged loyalty to Sun Quan and sent one of his sons, Shi Xin (士廞), as a hostage to Sun Quan to ensure his allegiance towards Wu. Sun Quan then appointed Shi Xin as the Administrator of Wuchang. During the conflict between Wu and its ally-turned-rival state Shu Han, Shi Xie sided with Wu and instigated Yong Kai (雍闓), a local tribal chief in Shu territory, to rebel against Shu rule and defect to Wu. In recognition of Shi Xie's efforts in inducing Yong Kai to defect, Sun Quan appointed Shi Xie as General of the Guards (衛將軍) and awarded him the title "Marquis of Longbian" (龍編侯).

Shi Xie also annually sent tribute to Sun Quan, including thousands of rare spices, silk, along with pearls, rare shells, lapis lazuli, tortoiseshell, rhinoceros horn, ivory, and Jiaozhi's fruits such as bananas, coconuts, and longans. Shi Xie's actions greatly pleased the Eastern Wu dynasty. Shi Xie died of illness in 226 around the age of 89-90, after ruling Jiaozhi for a total of 40 years. Đại Việt sử ký toàn thư records a mythical incident before his death, stating that Shi Xie once fell ill and was declared dead for three days. He was then given a pill by a xian, after which he regained consciousness and fully recovered after four days. Following this event, Shi Xie continued to govern until his death in 226.

== Family ==
Shi Xie's family tree

Shi Ci 士賜
Shi Xie 士燮 (137–226) | Shi Yi 士壹 | Shi Wei 士䵋 | Shi Wu 士武
Shi Xin 士廞 | Shi Zhi 士祗 | Shi Hui 士徽 (165–227) | Shi Gan 士幹 | Shi Song 士頌 | Shi Kuang 士匡

Shi Xie had at least five sons (in decreasing order of seniority): Shi Xin (士廞), Shi Zhi (士祗), Shi Hui (士徽), Shi Gan (士幹) and Shi Song (士頌).

After Shi Xie died in 226, his third son Shi Hui succeeded him as the Administrator of Jiaozhi Commandery (交趾郡) under the Eastern Wu regime. (Note: However, the Book of Liang recorded that in 226, the Administrator of Jiaozhi was Wu Miao (吴邈); a merchant from the Roman Empire arrived in Jiaozhi, and was sent by Wu Miao to Sun Quan's court. Sun Quan then asked the merchant for a report on his native country and its people.) Around the time, seeing that Jiao Province was too far away from the imperial court, the Wu emperor Sun Quan wanted to split Jiao Province and create another province, Guang Province (廣州): Jiaozhi, Jiuzhen (九真) and Rinan (日南) commanderies would remain part of Jiao Province; Cangwu (蒼梧), Nanhai (南海), Yulin (鬱林) and Hepu (合浦) commanderies would form the new Guang Province. Sun Quan then appointed Dai Liang (戴良) and Lü Dai as the Inspectors of Jiao and Guang provinces respectively. Chen Shi (陳時), a close aide of Sun Quan, was to replace Shi Hui as the Administrator of Jiaozhi Commandery.

In 227, when Shi Hui learnt about the new arrangements, he refused to comply and rebelled against Wu rule by sending his troops to block Dai Liang and Chen Shi from entering Jiao Province. Shi Hui appointed himself prefect of Jiaozhi. At the time, Huan Lin (桓鄰), one of Shi Hui's subordinates recommended by Xie, begged his superior to obey the order and surrender his governorship of Jiaozhi Commandery to Chen Shi. Shi Hui was furious by that and had Huan Lin flogged to death. Huan Lin's brother Zhi and his son, Huan Fa (桓發), started a mutiny against Shi Hui and engaged him in a battle that lasted a few months. They made peace after that.

In the meantime, after learning of Shi Hui's rebellion, Sun Quan ordered Lü Dai, the Inspector of Guang Province, to lead troops to recapture Jiaozhi Commandery. Lü Dai, who was close to Shi Hui's cousin Shi Kuang (士匡; a son of Shi Xie's brother Shi Yi [士壹]), sent Shi Kuang to persuade Shi Hui to surrender by promising that he would be spared if he did so. Shi Hui and his brothers then opened the gates of Jiaozhi Commandery and surrendered to Lü Dai. The following day, Lü Dai lured the Shi brothers into a trap during a banquet, had them arrested and then read out a list of Shi Hui's crimes. He then executed all of them and sent their heads to Sun Quan, who was in Wuchang (武昌; present-day Ezhou, Hubei) at the time.

Shi Xie's brothers, Shi Yi (士壹) and Shi Wei (士䵋), along with their families, were spared from death but reduced to the status of commoners. Some years later, Shi Yi and Shi Wei were executed for committing crimes.

Earlier in the 220s, Shi Xie had sent his eldest son, Shi Xin (士廞), as a hostage to Sun Quan to ensure the Wu emperor of his allegiance towards him. Shi Xin thus avoided ending up like Shi Hui and his other brothers, who were executed by Lü Dai in 227. Like the rest of the Shi family who survived (e.g. his uncles Shi Yi and Shi Wei [士䵋]), he was reduced to the status of a commoner after his brothers' deaths. He died of illness some time later, had no son to succeed him and left his wife a widow. An imperial edict granted his wife a monthly stipend of rice and a grant of 400,000 coins.

== Worship of "King Sĩ", Sĩ Tiếp in Vietnam ==
Shi Xie ruled Vietnam as an autonomous warlord for forty years and was posthumously deified by later Vietnamese monarchs. In the words of Stephen O'Harrow, Shi Xie was essentially "the first Vietnamese." According to Holmgren, Shi Xie's rule "is one of the milestones in the development and fusion of two new social groups in Tongking - a sinicised Vietnamese group and a Vietnamised Chinese group. The latter gradually came to identify with the interests of the delta rather than with the Chinese empire". Taylor (1983) also believed his imperial appointments gave formal legitimacy to "the emergence of a regional ruling class with strong ties to the local society". It is apparent from events following his death that he "presided over an aberrant regional power arrangement based on great Han-Viet families that could field private armies". From the Chinese's view, Shi Xie stood as a "frontier guardian"; from the Vietnamese side, he was the head of a regional ruling-class society. It was relatively easy for people to shift back and forth between these two perspectives. Thus, the man of Chinese or mixed ancestry playing a mixed role or, in some cases, an unambiguous Vietnamese role is a common figure in early Vietnamese history. "He was the first of many such people to emerge as strong regional leaders who nurtured the local society in the context of Chinese civilization". The people who emerged as Vietnamese leaders during this time were of mixed ancestry: most of their families had already been in Vietnam for several generations; they undoubtedly spoke Vietnamese; and their political outlook was based on the regional interests of Vietnamese society.

Shi Xie is still honoured in some Vietnamese temples today as "King Si" (Sĩ Vương). Đại Việt sử ký toàn thư records a piece of folklore explaining the worship of “King Sĩ” at the Long Biên Temple. The story dates to around 380 CE, approximately 160 years after Shi Xie’s death, when Jiaozhi was under the rule of the Jin dynasty. At that time, Champa launched an invasion of Jiaozhi and plundered Shi Xie’s tomb in search of treasure. When the tomb was opened, the invaders were astonished to find that Shi Xie’s face appeared lifelike, as if he were still alive. Frightened by this sight, the Champa forces reburied the tomb. After this incident, the local people came to regard Shi Xie as a deity and built a temple to worship him under the title “Tiên Sĩ Vương” (Xian King Sĩ).

The Vietnamese history Việt Điện U Linh Tập (越甸幽靈集; c. 1400) adds significantly to the traditions of the Chinese records with local Vietnamese traditions.

== See also ==
- Lists of people of the Three Kingdoms
- The surname Shì is related to the Fan clan (Phạm surname in Vietnamese)

== Notes ==
| Preceded by none | Administrator of Jiaozhi; Thái Thú Giao Châu; 187–226 | Succeeded by Shi Hui |
