= She =

She most often refers to:

- She (pronoun), the third person singular, feminine, nominative case pronoun in modern English

She or S.H.E. may also refer to:

== Arts and media ==
=== Literature and film ===
- She: A History of Adventure, an 1887 novel by H. Rider Haggard, and its film adaptations
  - She (1911 film), a silent short film featuring Marguerite Snow
  - She (1916 film), a silent film produced in the UK
  - She (1917 film), a silent film starring Valeska Suratt
  - She (1925 film), a silent film starring Betty Blythe
  - She (1935 film), featuring Helen Gahagan
  - She (1965 film), starring Ursula Andress
  - She (1984 film), starring Sandahl Bergman
  - She (2001 film), with Ophélie Winter
- She (1954 film), a West German comedy film directed by Rolf Thiele
- She (Wednesday Theatre), a 1967 Australian TV play ballet
- She (1984 film), a post-apocalyptic film by Avi Nesher
- She (2025 film), a documentary film about Vietnamese workers directed by Parsifal Reparato
- She (magazine), British monthly magazine, 1955–2011

=== Music ===
==== Artists ====
- S.H.E, a Taiwanese girl band
- SHE, or Solid HarmoniE, British pop girl group formed in 1996
- She (American band), a Sacramento garage rock band active from 1964 to 1971
- she (Swedish band), a virtual band formed in 2003 by Lain Trzaska

==== Albums ====
- she (Dalbello album), 1987
- She (Harry Connick Jr. album), 1994
- She (Jerusalem album), 2010
- She (Stiltskin album), 2006
- She (Viktor Lazlo album), 1985
- She (Wendy Matthews album), 2008
- s/he (album), by s/he, 2011
- She (EP), by Heo Young-saeng, 2013
- She, an EP by Monni, 2014
- She, by Sheryn Regis, 2022

==== Songs ====
See She (song)

=== Television ===
- She (TV series), Indian crime drama, 2020
- "She" (Angel), a 2000 episode of the television series Angel
- She (TV channel), an Israeli television channel
- "She", an episode of The Good Doctor

== People ==
- She people
  - She Chinese, a Sinitic language
  - She language, a Hmong–Mien language, Guangdong
- She (surname)
- She (Qi) (died 613 BC), ruler
- Empress She (died 397), Later Qin dynasty

== Places ==
=== Transport infrastructure ===
- Seaholme railway station, Melbourne
- Shenyang Taoxian International Airport, IATA code
- Sherborne railway station, Dorset, England, code
- Siu Hei stop, Hong Kong, MTR code

=== Other places ===
- She County, Anhui
  - She Prefecture, 589–1121
- She County, Hebei
- She River, or Sheshui, Hubei
- Shetland Islands, IIGA country code

== Science and technology ==
- SHE, Spin Hall effect, a transport phenomenon in a sample carrying electric current
- Standard hydrogen electrode
- Système Hydrologique Européen, a hydrological transport model

== Other uses ==
- Society for the History of Emotions within the ARC Centre of Excellence for the History of Emotions
- Safety, Health and Environment, or environment, health and safety

== See also ==
- Shi (disambiguation)
- He and She (disambiguation)
- Shae (disambiguation)
