= Shae =

Shae may refer to:

- Shae (character), a fictional character from George R. R. Martin's A Song of Ice and Fire novel series
- Shae (given name), a unisex given name
- Shae (singer), an Indonesian singer

== See also ==
- Sha (disambiguation)
- She (disambiguation)
- Shea (disambiguation)
- Shoe (disambiguation)
