= He and She =

He and She may refer to:

- He and She (album), by Wynton Marsalis
- He & She, a 1967 American TV sitcom starring Richard Benjamin and Paula Prentiss
- L'assoluto naturale, Italian film internationally released as He and She
- He and She (play), a 1920 play by Rachel Crothers

== See also ==
- He-she, or shemale
- She/he, the gender-independent third person pronoun, in couplet form
- She and He (1963 film), a Japanese film
- She & Him, an American musical duo
- Him & Her, a British television show
- Her & Him, an adult film
- His and Hers (disambiguation)
- He, She and It, 1991 novel
- She (disambiguation)
- He (disambiguation)
