= His and Hers =

His and Hers or His & Hers may refer to:

== Music ==
- His 'n' Hers, a 1994 album by Pulp
- "His 'n' Hers", a song by Pulp from their 1994 EP The Sisters EP
- His and Hers (album), a 2012 album by Joey + Rory
- "His & Hers" (song), by Internet Money, 2021

== Films ==
- His and Hers (film), a 1961 British comedy
- His & Hers (1997 film), an American film starring Danny Hoch
- His & Hers (2009 film), an Irish documentary

== Literature ==
- His & Hers, a 2020 novel by Alice Feeney

== Television ==
- His and Hers, a 1970s British sitcom starring Tim Brooke-Taylor
- His & Hers (1990 TV series), a 1990 American sitcom that aired on CBS
- His & Hers (2026 TV series), a 2026 American mystery thriller miniseries
- His and Hers (Australian TV series), 1971–1972 Australian television discussion show
- His & Hers (ESPN), a sports talk show on American basic cable and satellite television network ESPN2
- "His and Hers" (Are You Being Served?), an episode of Are You Being Served?

== See also ==
- Him & Her, a British television show
- She & Him, an American musical duo
- He and She (disambiguation)
- Hers (disambiguation)
- His (disambiguation)
