= Her =

Her is the objective and possessive form of the English-language feminine pronoun she.

Her, HER or H.E.R. may also refer to:

== Arts, entertainment and media ==
=== Music ===
==== Performers ====
- H.E.R. (born 1997), American singer
- HIM (Finnish band), once known as HER in the US
- Her, a band founded by Trish Doan

==== Albums ====
- H.E.R. (album), by H.E.R., 2017
- Her (score), by Arcade Fire and Owen Pallett, from the 2013 film
- Her (EP) or the title song by Minnie, 2025
- Her, an EP by Angel, 2016

==== Songs ====
- "Her" (song), by Megan Thee Stallion, 2022
- "Her", by Aaron Tippin from What This Country Needs, 1999
- "Her", by Anne-Marie, 2020
- "Her", by Chase Atlantic, 2019
- "Her", by Eels from Useless Trinkets: B-Sides, Soundtracks, Rarities and Unreleased 1996–2006, 2008
- "Her", by Got7 from Winter Heptagon, 2025
- "Her", by Guy from The Future, 1990
- "Her", by Musiq from Soulstar, 2003
- "Her", by Pigeonhed from Pigeonhed, 1993
- "Her", by Poppy from Flux, 2021
- "Her", by Spratleys Japs, 2018
- "Her", by Stan Getz from Focus, 1962
- "Her", by Swans from Love of Life, 1992
- "Her", by Tim McGraw from Standing Room Only, 2023
- "Her", by Tindersticks from Tindersticks, 1993
- "Her", by Tyler, the Creator from Goblin, 2011

=== Other media ===
- Her (2013 film), an American science fiction film
- Her (2024 film), an Indian Malayalam-language anthology film
- Her (comics) or Kismet, a Marvel Comics superhero
- Harvard Educational Review, a journal

== Places ==
- Helper (Amtrak station) (station code HER)
- Heraklion International Airport (IATA code HER)
- Khoy, Armenia (historical name)

== Science and technology ==
- Hydrogen evolution reaction
- HER2/neu, a protein
- Hercules (constellation)
- Hydroxyethylrutoside, a flavonoid
- High Explosive Research, the British project to develop atomic bombs independently after the Second World War

== Other uses ==
- Her (dating app), a geosocial networking app
- Her.ie, a website aimed at young women in Ireland
- Herero language (ISO 639-3 code)
- Historic Environment Record, in the UK
- Housing and Economic Recovery Act of 2008, in the US

== See also ==
- Hers (disambiguation)
- Hur (disambiguation)
