= Shi Hui (Eastern Wu) =

Official of the state of Eastern Wu (165–227)

Chinese name
- Traditional Chinese: 士徽
- Simplified Chinese: 士徽
Transcriptions

Vietnamese name
- Vietnamese: Sĩ Huy

Shi Hui (165–227), also known by his Vietnamese name Sĩ Huy, was an official of the state of Eastern Wu during the Three Kingdoms period of China.

Shi Hui was the third son of Shi Xie. Following his father's death in 226, he succeeded as the Administrator of Jiaozhi Commandery. The Wu emperor, Sun Quan, thought Jiaozhi was too far to control, so he split Jiaozhi into three Guangzhou, Jiaozhi and Jiaozhou. Lü Dai and Dai Liang (戴良) were appointed as Administrator of Guangzhou and Jiaozhou respectively. In the same time, Shi Hui was appointed as Administrator of Jiuzhen and ordered to leave Jiaozhi, while Chen Shi (陳時) (Note: Not the same person as the Shu Han general with a similar name.), a close aide of Sun Quan, was to replace him as the Administrator of Jiaozhi.

Hearing about the new arrangements, Shi was discontent. He sent troops to prevent Dai Liang and Chen Shi from entering his area. Lü Dai was ordered to put down his rebellion. Shi Kuang, a cousin of Shi Hui, was sent to persuade him to surrender. Lü promised that his life would be spared. Shi Hui opened the gate and submitted to Lü Dai. Lü Dai set a trap and had him and his brothers executed. Their heads were sent to Wuchang.

== See also ==
- List of people of the Three Kingdoms
- Chen Shou
- Records of the Three Kingdoms

== Notes ==
Preceded by Shi Xie (Sĩ Nhiếp)	Inspector of the Jiaozhi; Jiao Zhou Cishi; Thái Thú Giao Châu; 226–227	Succeeded by none
