= Chi-Chi =

Chi-Chi or Chi Chi may refer to:

== Geography ==
- Chi-chi, Nantou, a township in Taiwan

== People ==
- Chi Chi DeVayne, stage name of American drag queen Zavion Michael Davenport (1985–2020)
- Chi Chi Gonzalez (born 1992), American baseball pitcher
- Chi-Chi Igbo (born 1986), Danish–Nigerian footballer
- Chi Chi Izundu, BBC journalist and reporter
- Chi Chi LaRue, a drag queen persona of director of gay and bisexual pornography Larry David Paciotti (born 1959)
- Chi-chi Nwanoku (born 1956), British double bassist
- Chi-Chi Olivo (1928–1977), Major League Baseball pitcher
- Rafael Quintero (1940–2006), American CIA operative
- Chi-Chi Rodríguez (1935–2024), Puerto Rican golfer
- Chi Chi Valenti, American journalist and performance artist
- Chi Chi (record producer), Nigerian-American record producer and songwriter Chidi Osondu
- Chi Chi, a ring name of American professional wrestler Allan Funk (born 1971)
- Chi Chi, nickname of Bollywood actor Govinda (born 1963)

== Characters ==
- Chi-Chi (Dragon Ball), Chichi or Chi Chi, a character in Dragon Ball media
- Chi Chi, a character in the Scarface universe

== Music ==
- "Chi Chi" (Azealia Banks song), 2017
- "Chi Chi" (Trey Songz song), 2019

== Other uses ==
- Chi-Chi's, an international Tex-Mex restaurant chain
- Chi Chi (giant panda) (1957–1972), star attraction at London Zoo from 1958 to 1972
- Chi Chi, a variant of the piña colada cocktail
- Diaprepes abbreviatus, a species of weevils colloquially called chichí

== See also ==
- Chichi (disambiguation)
- Chee-Chee (disambiguation)
- Chicha, a Southern and Central American drink
- Chi chi man, an offensive slang term in Jamaican and Caribbean English referring to gay men
- Shishi (disambiguation)
