= Four occupations =

Ancient Chinese classification of occupations

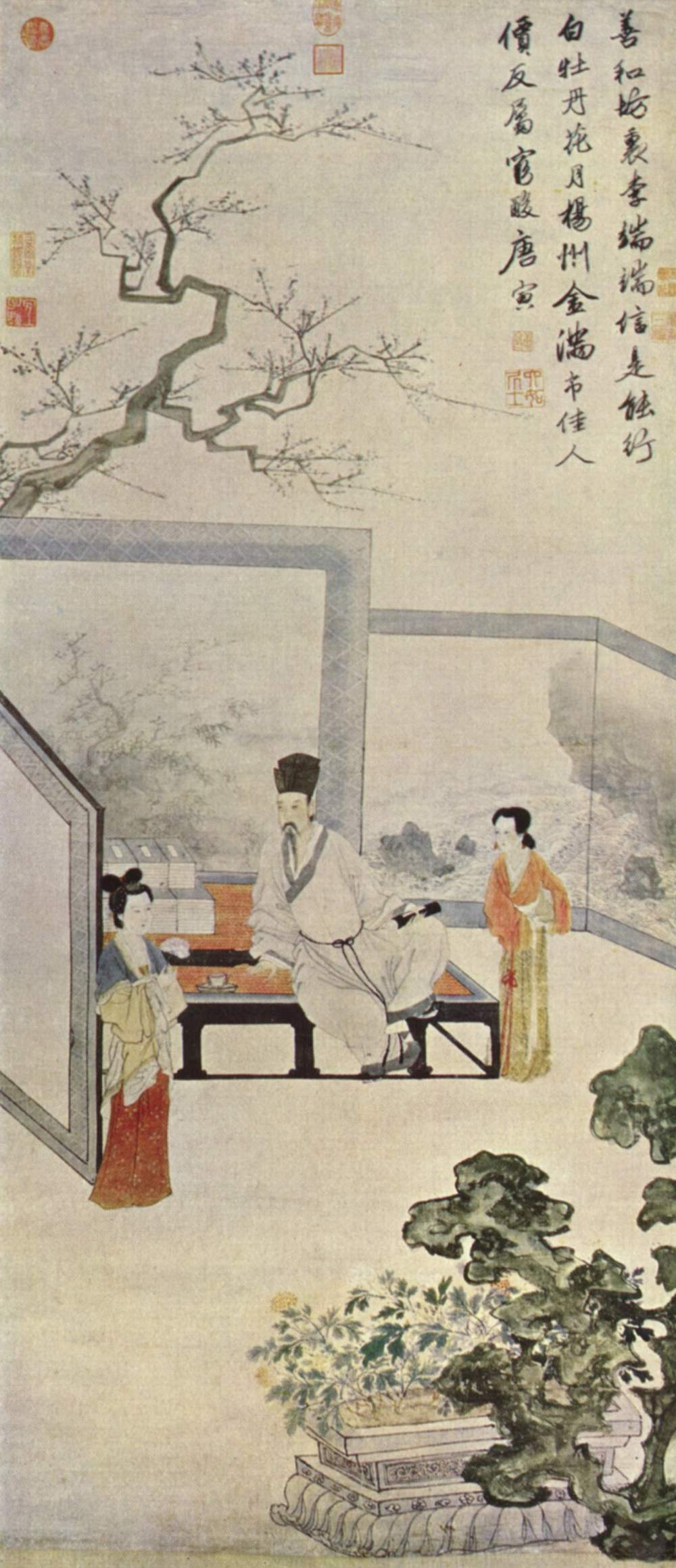
A painting of a gentry scholar with two courtesans, by Tang Yin, c. 1500

The four occupations (simplified Chinese: 士农工商; traditional Chinese: 士農工商; pinyin: Shì nóng gōng shāng), or "four categories of the people" (Chinese: 四民; pinyin: sì mín), was an occupation classification used in ancient China by either Confucian or Legalist scholars as far back as the late Zhou dynasty and is considered a central part of the fengjian social structure (c. 1046–256 BC). These were the shi (warrior nobles, and later on gentry scholars), the nong (peasant farmers), the gong (artisans and craftsmen), and the shang (merchants and traders). The four occupations were not always arranged in this order. The four categories were not socioeconomic classes; wealth and standing did not correspond to these categories, nor were they hereditary.

The system did not factor in all social groups present in premodern Chinese society, and its broad categories were more an idealization than a practical reality. The commercialization of Chinese society in the Song and Ming periods further blurred the lines between these four occupations. The definition of the identity of the shi class changed over time—from warriors to aristocratic scholars, and finally to scholar-bureaucrats. There was also a gradual fusion of the wealthy merchant and landholding gentry classes, culminating in the late Ming dynasty.

In some manner, this system of social order was adopted throughout the Chinese cultural sphere. In Japanese it is called "Shi, nō, kō, shō" (士農工商, shinōkōshō), and the three under the samurai class were equal social and occupational classifications, while the shi was modified into a hereditary class, the samurai. In Korean it is called "Sa, nong, gong, sang" (사농공상; 士農工商), and in Vietnamese is called "Sĩ, nông, công, thương" (士農工商). The main difference in adaptation was the definition of the shi (士).

== Background ==
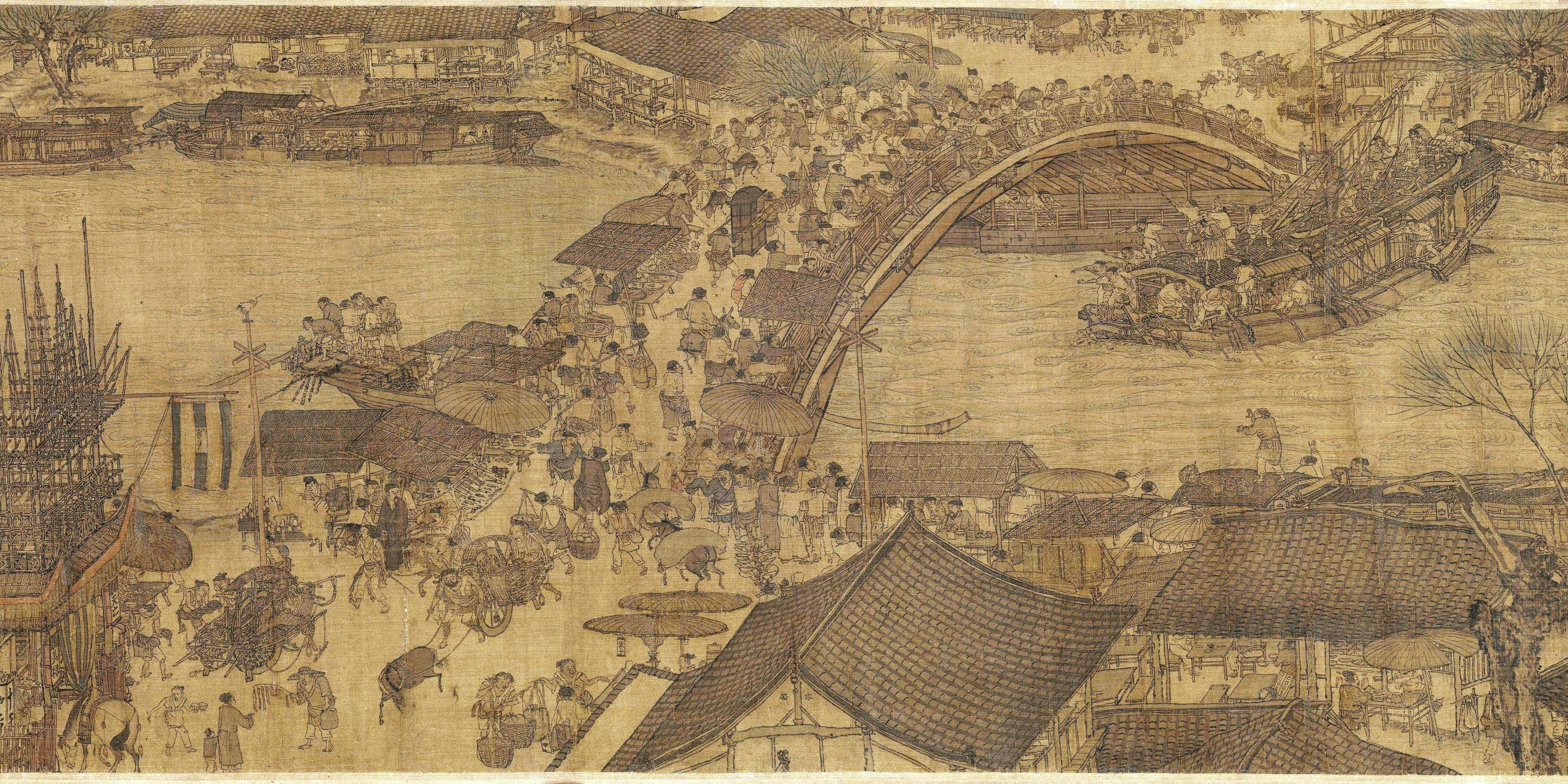
Street scene in Bianjing (modern Kaifeng)

From existing literary evidence, commoner categories in China were employed for the first time during the Warring States period (403–221 BC). Despite this, Eastern-Han (AD 25–220) historian Ban Gu (AD 32–92) asserted in his Book of Han that the four occupations for commoners had existed in the Western Zhou (c. 1050–771 BC) era, which he considered a golden age. However, it is now known that the classification of four occupations as Ban Gu understood it did not exist until the 2nd century BC. Ban explained the social hierarchy of each group in descending order:

Scholars, farmers, artisans, and merchants; each of the four peoples had their respective profession. Those who studied in order to occupy positions of rank were called the shi (scholars). Those who cultivated the soil and propagated grains were called nong (farmers). Those who manifested skill (qiao) and made utensils were called gong (artisans). Those who transported valuable articles and sold commodities were called shang (merchants).

The Rites of Zhou described the four groups in a different order, with merchants before farmers. The Han-era text Guliang Zhuan placed merchants second after scholars, and the Warring States-era Xunzi placed farmers before scholars. The Shuo Yuan mentioned a quotation which stressed the ideal of equality between the four occupations.

Anthony J. Barbieri-Low, Professor of Early Chinese History at the University of California, Santa Barbara, writes that the classification of "four occupations" can be viewed as a mere rhetorical device that had no effect on government policy. However, he notes that although no statute in the Qin or Han law codes specifically mentions the four occupations, some laws did treat these broadly classified social groups as separate units with different levels of legal privilege.

The categorisation was sorted according to the principle of economic usefulness to state and society, that those who used mind rather than muscle (scholars) were placed first, with farmers, seen as the primary creators of wealth, placed next, followed by artisans, and finally merchants who were seen as a social disturbance for excessive accumulation of wealth or erratic fluctuation of prices. Beneath the four occupations were the "mean people" (Chinese: 賤民 jiànmín), outcasts from "humiliating" occupations such as entertainers and prostitutes.

The four occupations were not a hereditary system. The four occupations system differed from those of European feudalism in that people were not born into the specific classes, such that, for example, a son born to a gong craftsman was able to become a part of the shang merchant class, and so on. Theoretically, any man could become an official through the Imperial examinations.

From the fourth century BC, the shi and some wealthy merchants wore long flowing silken robes, while the working class wore trousers.

== Shì (士) ==
=== Ancient Warrior class ===
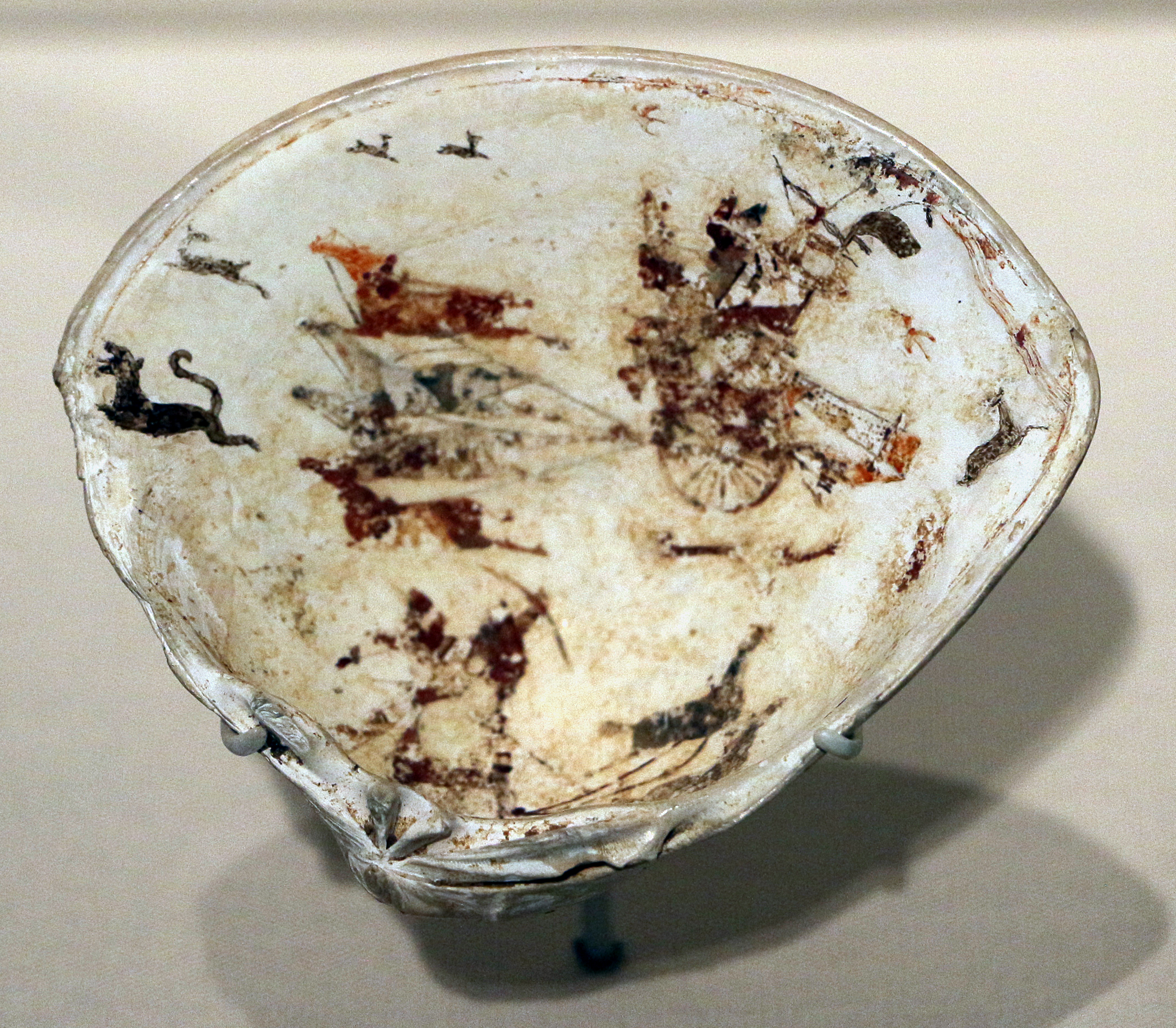
Chariot archer, c. 300 BC

During the ancient Shang (1600–1046 BC), Western Zhou (1046–771 BC), Spring and Autumn (770-481 BC), and early Warring States (475-221 BC) periods, the shi were a knightly social order of low-level aristocratic lineage compared to dukes and marquises. The shi were distinguished by their right to ride and command battles from chariots, while they also served civil functions. Initially rising to power through controlling the new technology of bronzeworking, from 1300 BC, the shi transitioned from foot knights to being primarily chariot archers, fighting with composite recurved bow, a double-edged sword known as the jian, and armour.

The shi had a strict code of chivalry. In the battle of Zheqiu, 420 BC, the shi Hua Bao shot at and missed another shi Gongzi Cheng, and just as he was about to shoot again, Gongzi Cheng said that it was unchivalrous to shoot twice without allowing him to return a shot. Hua Bao lowered his bow and was subsequently shot dead. In 624 BC a disgraced shi from the State of Jin led a suicidal charge of chariots to redeem his reputation, turning the tide of the battle. In the Battle of Bi, 597 BC, the routing chariot forces of Jin were bogged down in mud, but pursuing enemy troops stopped to help them get dislodged and allowed them to escape.

As chariot warfare became eclipsed by mounted cavalry and infantry units with effective crossbowmen in the Warring States period, the participation of the shi in battle dwindled as rulers sought men with actual military training, not just aristocratic background. This was also a period where philosophical schools flourished in China, while intellectual pursuits became highly valued amongst statesmen. Thus, the shi eventually became renowned not for their warrior's skills, but for their scholarship, abilities in administration, and sound ethics and morality supported by competing philosophical schools.

=== Scholar-Officials ===
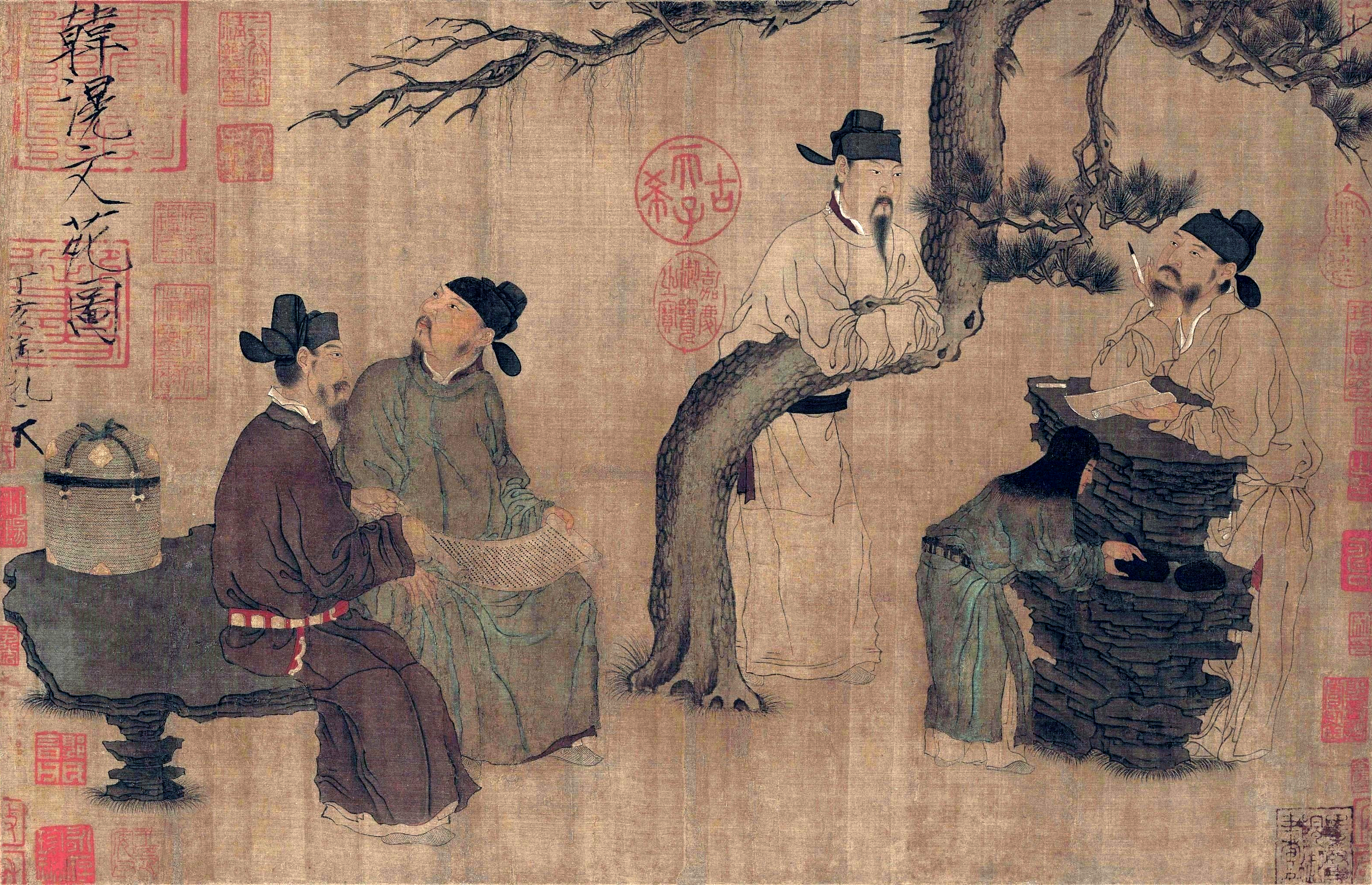
A Literary Garden, by Zhou Wenju, 10th century

Under Duke Xiao of Qin and the chief minister and reformer Shang Yang (d. 338 BC), the ancient State of Qin was transformed by a new meritocratic yet harsh philosophy of Legalism. This philosophy stressed stern punishments for those who disobeyed the publicly known laws while rewarding those who labored for the state and strove diligently to obey the laws. It was a means to diminish the power of the nobility, and was another force behind the transformation of the shi class from warrior-aristocrats into merit-driven officials. When the Qin dynasty (221–206 BC) unified China under the Legalist system, the emperor assigned administration to dedicated officials rather than nobility, ending feudalism in China, replacing it with a centralized, bureaucratic government. The form of government created by the first emperor and his advisors was used by later dynasties to structure their own government. Under this system, the government thrived, as talented individuals could be more easily identified in the transformed society. However, the Qin became infamous for its oppressive measures, and so collapsed into a state of civil war after the death of the Emperor.

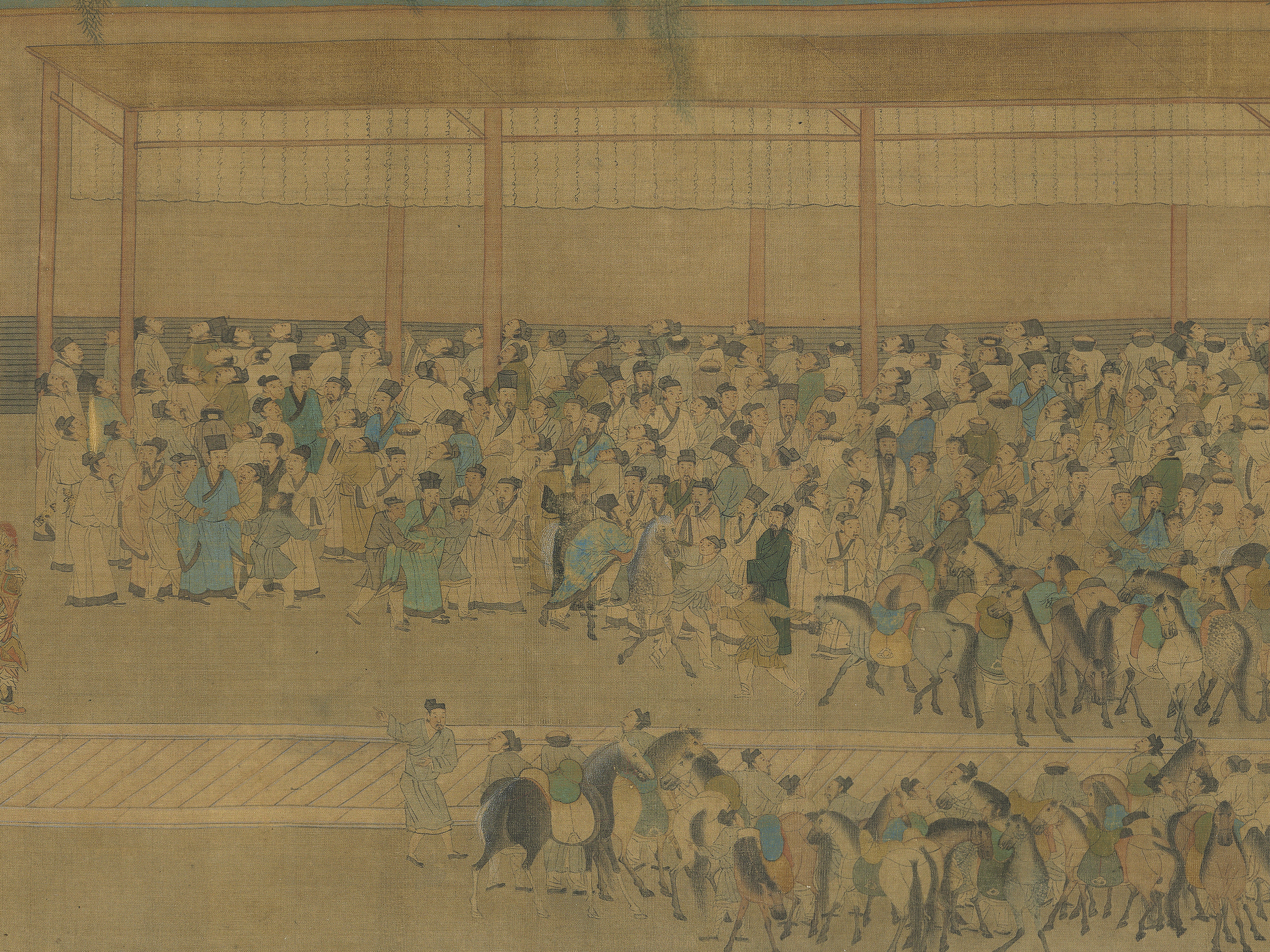
Candidates gathering around the wall where the results are posted. This announcement was known as "releasing the roll" (放榜). (c. 1540, by Qiu Ying)

The victor of this war was Liu Bang, who initiated four centuries of unification of China proper under the Han dynasty (202 BC–AD 220). In 165 BC, Emperor Wen introduced the first method of recruitment to civil service through examinations, while Emperor Wu (r. 141–87 BC), cemented the ideology of Confucius into mainstream governance installed a system of recommendation and nomination in government service known as xiaolian, and a national academy whereby officials would select candidates to take part in an examination of the Confucian classics, from which Emperor Wu would select officials.

In the Sui dynasty (581–618) and the subsequent Tang dynasty (618–907) the shi class would begin to present itself by means of the fully standardized civil service examination system, of partial recruitment of those who passed standard exams and earned an official degree. Yet recruitment by recommendations to office was still prominent in both dynasties. It was not until the Song dynasty (960–1279) that the recruitment of those who passed the exams and earned degrees was given greater emphasis and significantly expanded. The shi class also became less aristocratic and more bureaucratic due to the highly competitive nature of the exams during the Song period.

Beyond serving in the administration and the judiciary, scholar-officials also provided government-funded social services, such as prefectural or county schools, free-of-charge public hospitals, retirement homes and paupers' graveyards. Scholars such as Shen Kuo (1031–1095) and Su Song (1020–1101) dabbled in every known field of science, mathematics, music and statecraft, while others like Ouyang Xiu (1007–1072) or Zeng Gong (1019–1083) pioneered ideas in early epigraphy, archeology and philology.

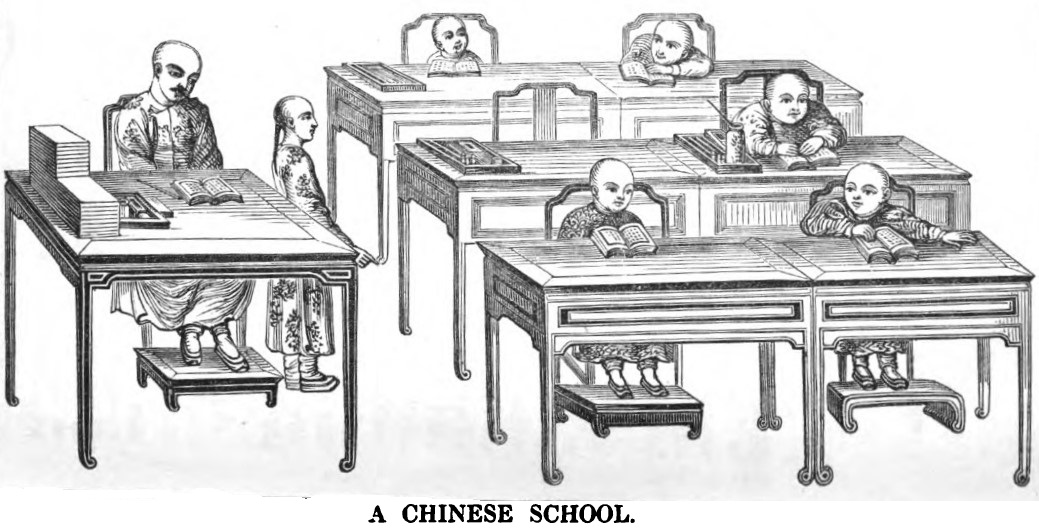
A Chinese School (1847)

From the 11th to 13th century, the number of exam candidates participating in taking the exams increased dramatically from merely 30,000 to 400,000 by the dynasty's end. Widespread printing through woodblock and movable type enhanced the spread of knowledge amongst the literate in society, enabling more people to become candidates and competitors vying for a prestigious degree. With a dramatically expanding population matching a growing amount of gentry, while the number of official posts remained constant, the graduates who were not appointed to government would provide critical services in local communities, such as funding public works, running private schools, aiding in tax collection, maintaining order, or writing local gazetteers.

== Nóng (农/農) ==
A farmer (nong) operating a pulley wheel to lift a bucket, from the Tiangong Kaiwu encyclopedia by Song Yingxing (1587–1666)

Since Neolithic times in China, agriculture was a key element to the rise of China's civilization and every other civilization. The food that farmers produced sustained the whole of society, while the land tax exacted on farmers' lots and landholders' property produced much of the state revenue for China's pre-modern ruling dynasties. Therefore, the farmer was a valuable member of society, and even though he was not considered one with the shi class, the families of the shi were usually landholders that often produced crops and foodstuffs.

From the ninth century BC (late Western Zhou dynasty) to around the end of the Warring States period, agricultural land was distributed according to the well-field system (井田), whereby a square area of land was divided into nine identically-sized sections; the eight outer sections (私田; sītián) were privately cultivated by farmers and the center section (公田; gōngtián) was communally cultivated on behalf of the landowning aristocrat. When the system became economically untenable in the Warring States period, it was replaced by a system of private land ownership. It was first suspended in the state of Qin by Shang Yang and other states soon followed suit.

From AD 485–763, land was equally distributed to farmers under the equal-field system (均田). Families were issued plots of land on the basis of how many able men, including slaves, they had; a woman would be entitled to a smaller plot. As government control weakened in the 8th century, land reverted into the hands of private owners.

Song dynasty (950–1279) rural farmers engaged in the small-scale production of wine, charcoal, paper, textiles, and other goods.

By the Ming dynasty (1368–1644), the socioeconomic class of farmers grew more and more indistinct from another social class in the four occupations: the artisan. Artisans began working on farms in peak periods and farmers often traveled into the city to find work during times of dearth. The distinction between what was town and country was blurred in Ming China, since suburban areas with farms were located just outside and in some cases within the walls of a city.

== Gōng (工) ==
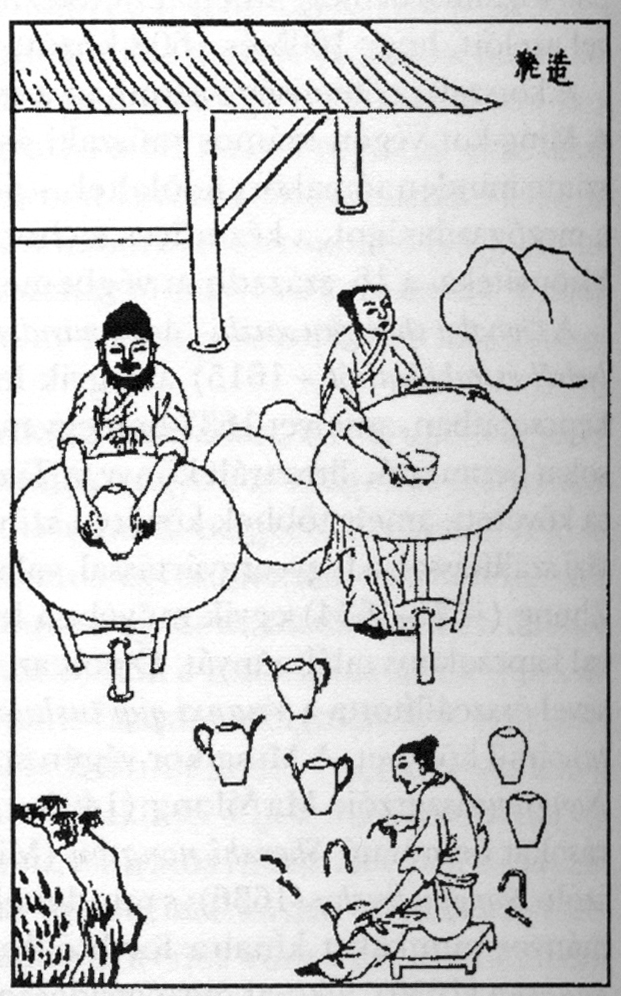
Ming era pottery workshop

Artisans and craftsmen—their class identified with the Chinese character meaning labour—were much like farmers in the respect that they produced essential goods needed by themselves and the rest of society. Although they could not provide the state with much of its revenues since they often had no land of their own to be taxed, artisans and craftsmen were theoretically respected more than merchants. Since ancient times, the skilled work of artisans and craftsmen was handed down orally from father to son, although the work of architects and structural builders were sometimes codified, illustrated, and categorized in Chinese written works.

Artisans and craftsmen were either government-employed or worked privately. A successful and highly skilled artisan could often gain enough capital in order to hire others as apprentices or additional laborers that could be overseen by the chief artisan as a manager. Hence, artisans could create their own small enterprises in selling their work and that of others, and like the merchants, they formed their own guilds.

Researchers have pointed to the rise of wage labour in late Ming and early Qing workshops in textile, paper and other industries, achieving large-scale production by using many small workshops, each with a small team of workers under a master craftsman.

Although architects and builders were not as highly venerated as the scholar-officials, there were some architectural engineers who gained wide acclaim for their achievements. One example of this would be the Yingzao Fashi printed in 1103, an architectural building manual written by Li Jie (1065–1110), sponsored by Emperor Huizong (r. 1100–1126) for these government agencies to employ and was widely printed for the benefit of literate craftsmen and artisans nationwide.

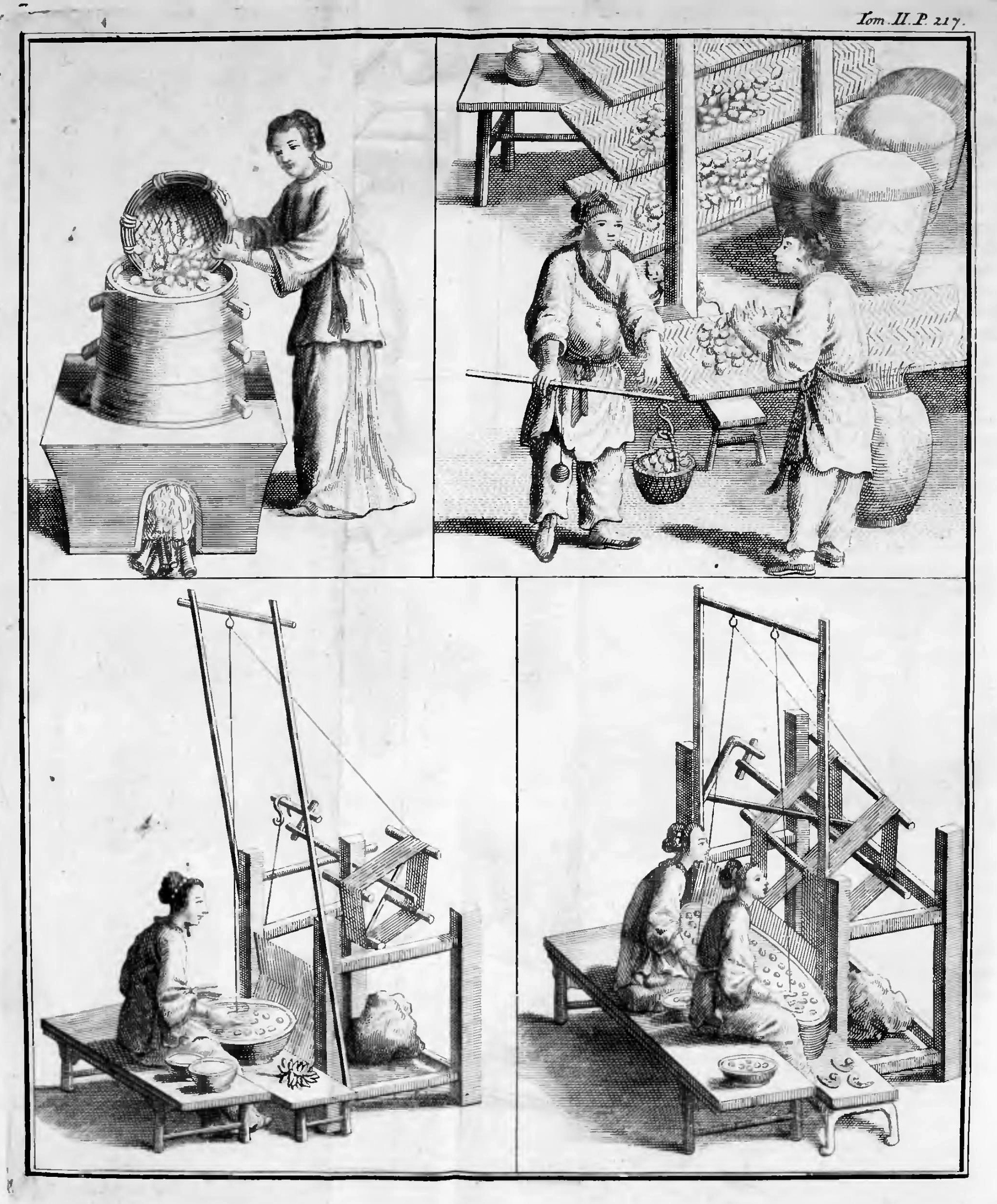
Workers in the porcelain and silk industries (early 18th century)

In the late of Ming dynasty there were many porcelain kilns created that led the Ming dynasty to be economically well off. The Qing emperors like the Kangxi Emperor helped the growth of porcelain export and by allowing an organization of private maritime trade that assisted families who owned private kilns. Chinese export porcelain, designed purely for the European market and unpopular among locals as it lacked the symbolic significance of wares produced for the Chinese home market, was a highly popular trade good.

In China, silk-worm farming was originally restricted to women, and many women were employed in the silk-making industry. Even as knowledge of silk production spread to the rest of the world, Song dynasty China was able to maintain near-monopoly on manufacture by large scale industrialization, through the two-person draw loom, commercialized mulberry cultivation, and a factory production. The organization of silk weaving in 18th-century Chinese cities was compared with the putting-out system used in European textile industries between the 13th and 18th centuries. As the interregional silk trade grew, merchant houses began to organize manufacture to guarantee their supplies, providing silk to households for weaving as piece work.

== Shāng (商) ==
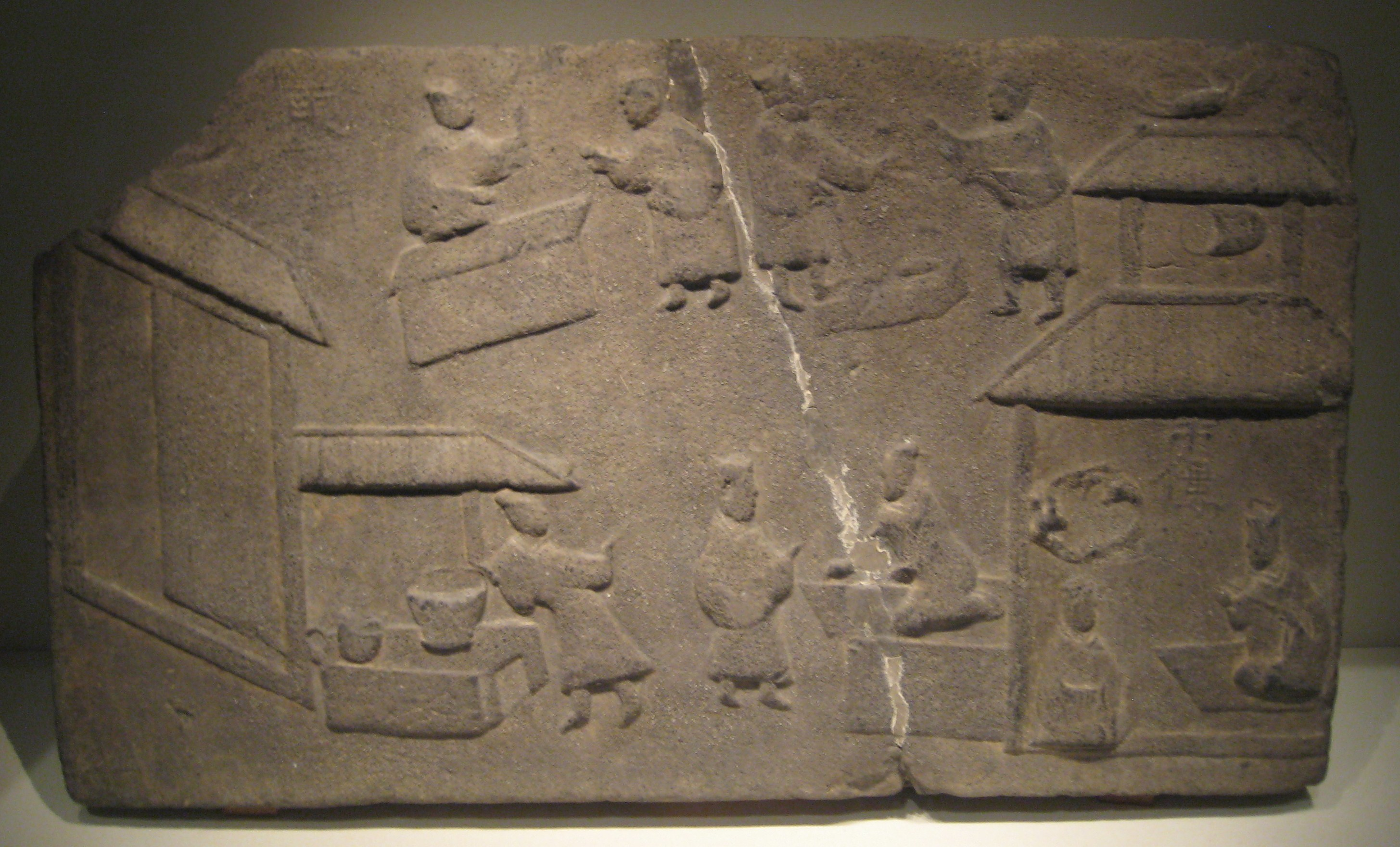
Depiction of a marketplace, Han dynasty

In Ancient pre-Imperial China, merchants were highly regarded as necessary for the circulation of essential goods. The legendary Emperor Shun, prior to receiving the throne from his predecessor, was said to be a merchant. Archaeological artifacts and oracle bones suggest a high status was accorded to merchant activity. In the Spring and Autumn period, Hegemon of China Duke Huan of Qi appointed Guan Zhong, a merchant, as Prime Minister. He cut taxes for merchants, built rest stops for merchants, and encouraged other lords to lower tariffs.

In Imperial China, the merchants, traders, and peddlers of goods were viewed by the scholarly elite as essential members of society, yet were esteemed least of the four occupations in society, due to the view that they were a threat to social harmony from acquiring disproportionally large incomes, market manipulation or exploiting farmers.

However, the merchant class of China throughout all of Chinese history were usually wealthy and held considerable influence above its supposed social standing. The Confucian philosopher Xunzi encouraged economic cooperation and exchange. The distinction between gentry and merchants was not as clear or entrenched as in Japan and Europe, and merchants were even welcomed by gentry if they abided by Confucian moral duties. Merchants accepted and promoted Confucian society by funding education and charities, and advocating Confucian values of self-cultivation of integrity, frugality, and hard work. By the late imperial period, it was a trend in some regions for scholars to switch to careers as merchants. William Rowe's research of rural elites in late imperial Hanyang, Hubei shows that there was a very high level of overlap and mixing between the gentry and the merchants.

Han dynasty writers mention merchants owning huge tracts of land. A merchant who owned property worth a thousand catties of gold—equivalent to ten million cash coins—was considered a great merchant. Such a fortune was one hundred times larger than the average income of a middle class landowner-cultivator and dwarfed the annual 200,000 cash-coin income of a marquess who collected taxes from a thousand households. Some merchant families made fortunes worth over a hundred million cash, which was equivalent to the wealth acquired by the highest officials in government. Itinerant merchants who traded between a network of towns and cities were often rich as they had the ability to avoid registering as merchants (unlike the shopkeepers), Chao Cuo (d. 154 BC) states that they wore fine silks, rode in carriages pulled by fat horses, and whose wealth allowed them to associate with government officials.

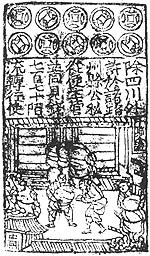
The first banknotes originated in China as merchant receipts in the 7th century, becoming government-issued currency by the 11th century.

Historians like Yu Yingshi and Billy So have shown that as Chinese society became increasingly commercialized from the Song dynasty onward, Confucianism had gradually begun to accept and even support business and trade as legitimate and viable professions, as long as merchants stayed away from unethical actions. Merchants in the meantime had also benefited from and utilized Confucian ethics in their business practices. By the Song period, merchants often colluded with the scholarly elite; as early as 955, the Scholar-officials themselves were using intermediary agents to participate in trading. Since the Song government took over several key industries and imposed strict state monopolies, the government itself acted as a large commercial enterprise run by scholar-officials. The state also had to contend with the merchant guilds; whenever the state requisitioned goods and assessed taxes it dealt with guild heads, who ensured fair prices and fair wages via official intermediaries.

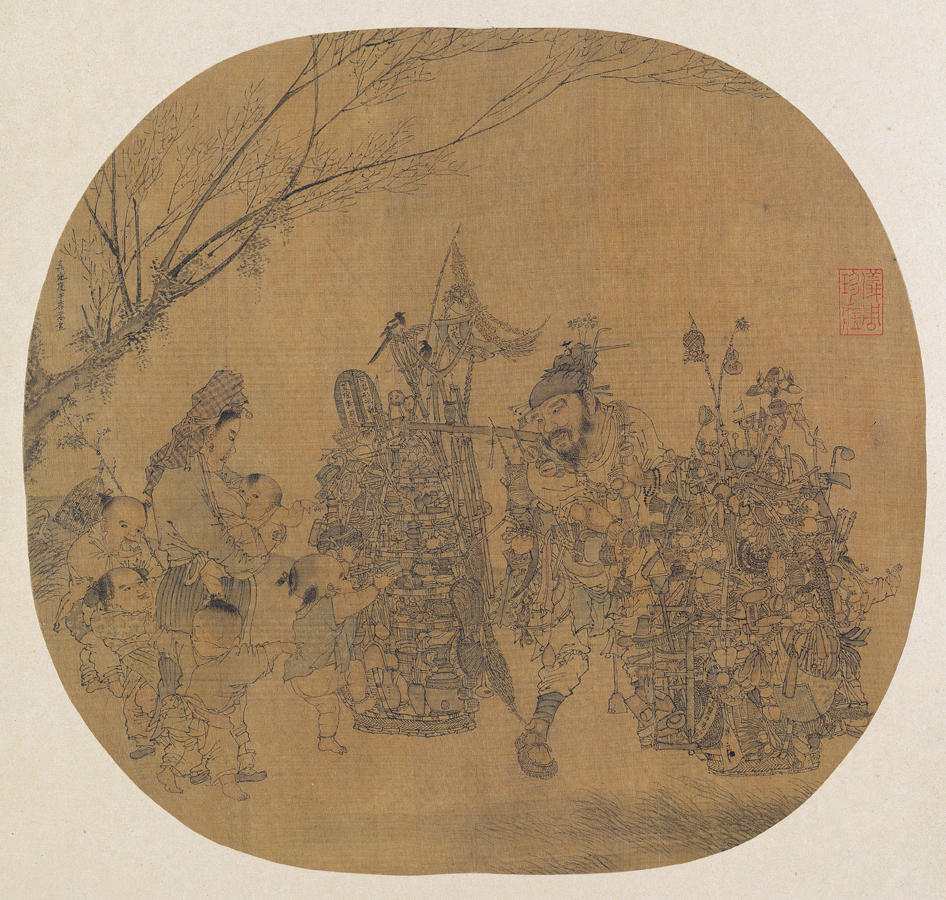
Painting of a woman and children surrounding a peddler of goods in the countryside, by Li Song (c. 1190–1225), dated 1210 AD

By the late Ming dynasty, the officials often needed to solicit funds from powerful merchants to build new roads, schools, bridges, pagodas, or engage in essential industries, such as book-making, which aided the gentry class in education for the imperial examinations. Merchants began to imitate the highly cultivated nature and manners of scholar-officials in order to appear more cultured and gain higher prestige and acceptance by the scholarly elite. They even purchased printed books that served as guides to proper conduct and behavior and which promoted merchant morality and business ethics. The social status of merchants rose to such significance that by the late Ming period, many scholar-officials were unabashed to declare publicly in their official family histories that they had family members who were merchants. The scholar-officials' dependence upon merchants received semi-legal standing when scholar-official Qiu Jun (1420–1495), argued that the state should only mitigate market affairs during times of pending crisis and that merchants were the best gauge in determining the strength of a nation's riches in resources. The Imperial court followed this guideline by granting merchants licenses to trade in salt in return for grain shipments to frontier garrisons in the north. The state realized that merchants could buy salt licenses with silver and in turn boost state revenues to the point where buying grain was not an issue.

Merchants banded in organisations known as huiguan or gongsuo; pooling capital was popular as it distributed risk and eased the barriers to market entry. They formed partnerships known as huoji zhi (silent investor and active partner), lianhao zhi (subsidiary companies), jingli fuzhe zhi (owner delegates control to a manager), xuetu zhi (apprenticeship), and hegu zhi (shareholding). Merchants had a tendency to invest their profits in vast swathes of land.

== Outside China ==
Outside of China, the same values permeated and prevailed across other East Asian societies where China exerted considerable influence. Japan and Korea were so heavily influenced by Confucian thought that the four occupational social hierarchy in those societies were modeled from that of China's.

=== Ryukyu Kingdom ===
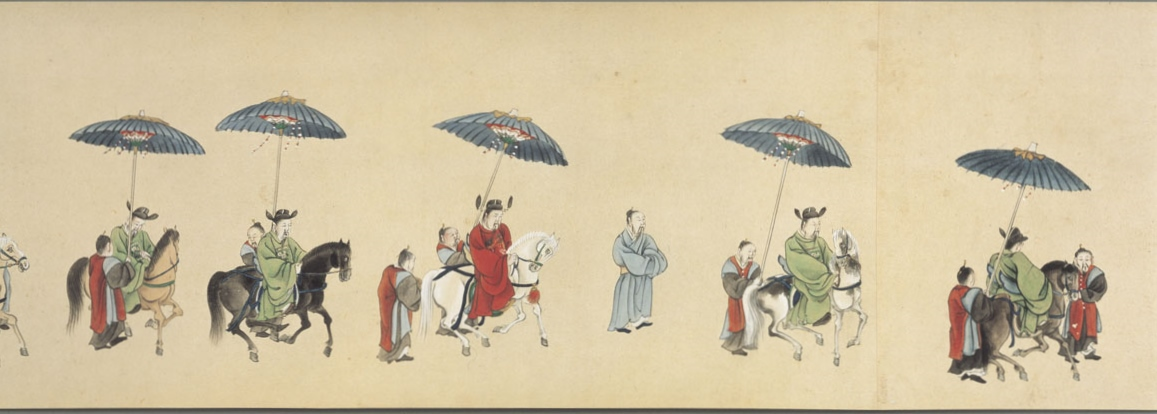
Envoys of Ryukyu to Edo

A similar situation occurred in the Ryūkyū Kingdom with the scholarly class of yukatchu, but yukatchu status was hereditary and could be bought from the government as the kingdom's finances were frequently deficient. Due to the growth of this class and the lack of government positions open for them, Sai On allowed yukatchu to become merchants and artisans while keeping their high status. There were three classes of yukatchu, the pechin, satonushi and chikudun, and commoners may be admitted for meritorious service. The Ryukyu Kingdom's capital of Shuri also featured a university and school system, alongside a civil service examination system. The government was managed by the Seissei, Sanshikan and the Bugyo (Prime Minister, Council of Ministers and Administrative Departments). Yukatchu who failed the examinations or were otherwise deemed unsuitable for office would be transferred to obscure posts and their descendants would fade into insignificance. Ryukyuan students were also enrolled into the National Academy (Guozijian) in China, at Chinese government expense, and others studied privately at schools in Fujian province such diverse skills as law, agriculture, calendrical calculation, medicine, astronomy, and metallurgy.

=== Japan ===
In Japan, the shi role, unlike the scholars in China, became a hereditary class known as the samurai, and marriage between people of unequal class was socially unacceptable. Originally a martial class, the samurai became civil administrators to their daimyōs during the Tokugawa shogunate. No exams were needed as the positions were inherited. They constituted about 5% of the population and were allowed to have a proper surname. Older scholars believed that there were Shi-nō-kō-shō (士農工商) of "samurai, peasants (hyakushō), craftsmen, and merchants (chōnin)" under the daimyo, with 80% of peasants under the 5% samurai class, followed by craftsmen and merchants. However, various studies have revealed since about 1995 that the classes of peasants, craftsmen, and merchants under the samurai were equal, and the old hierarchy chart has been removed from Japanese history textbooks. In other words, peasants, craftsmen, and merchants are not a social pecking order, but a social classification.

In the sixteenth century, lords began to centralise administration by replacing enfeoffment with stipend grants, and placing pressure on vassals to relocate into castle towns, away from independent power bases. Military commanders became rotated to avert the formation of strong personal loyalties from the troops. Artisans and merchants were solicited by these lords and sometimes received official appointments. This century was a period of exceptional social mobility, with instances of merchants of samurai-descent or commoners becoming samurai. By the eighteenth century samurai and merchants had become interwoven intimately, despite general samurai hostility toward merchants who as their creditors were blamed for the financial difficulties of a debt-ridden samurai class.

=== Korea ===
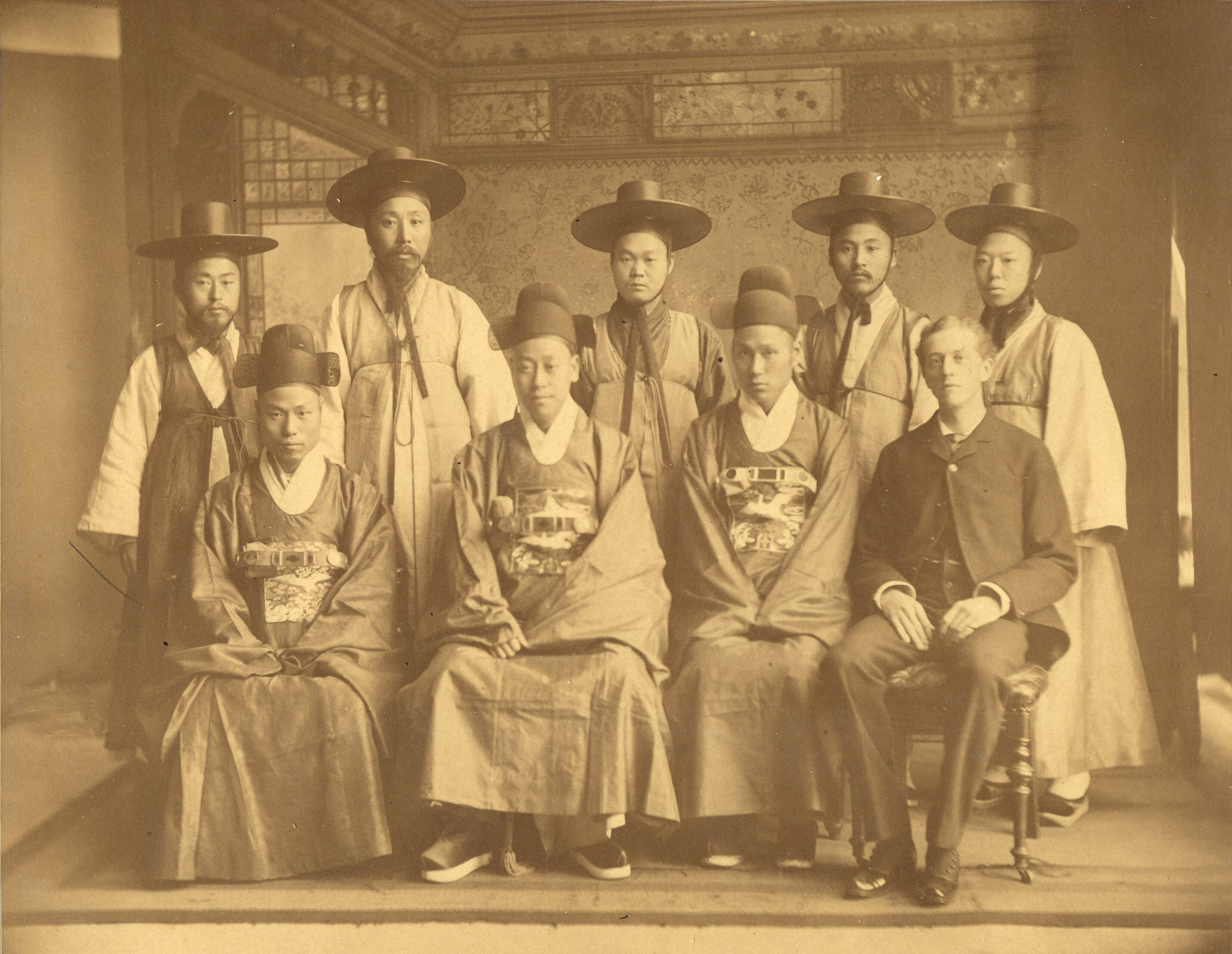
Korean envoys to the United States

In Silla Korea, the scholar-officials, also known as head rank 6, 5, and 4 (두품), were strictly hereditary castes under the bone-rank system (골품제도), and their power was limited by the royal clan who monopolized the positions of importance.

From the late 8th century, succession wars in Silla, as well as frequent peasant uprisings, led to the dismantling of the bone-rank system. Head rank 6 leaders sojourned to China for study, while regional governance fell into the hojok or castle-lords commanding private armies detached from the central regime. These factions coalesced, introducing a new national ideology that was an amalgamation of Chan Buddhism, Confucianism and Feng Shui, laying the foundation for the formation of the new Goryeo Kingdom. King Gwangjong of Goryeo introduced a civil service examination system in 958, and King Seongjong of Goryeo complemented it with the establishment of a Confucian-style educational facilities and administration structures, extending for the first time to local areas. However, only aristocrats were permitted to sit for these examinations, and the sons of officials of at least 5th rank were exempt completely.

In Joseon Korea, the Scholar occupation took the form of the noble yangban class, which prevented the lower classes from taking the advanced gwageo exams so they could dominate the bureaucracy. Below the yangban were the chungin, a class of privileged commoners who were petty bureaucrats, scribes, and specialists. The chungin were actually the least populous class, even smaller than the yangban. The yangban constituted 10% of the population. From the mid-Joseon period, military officers and civil officials were separately derived from different clans.

=== Vietnam ===
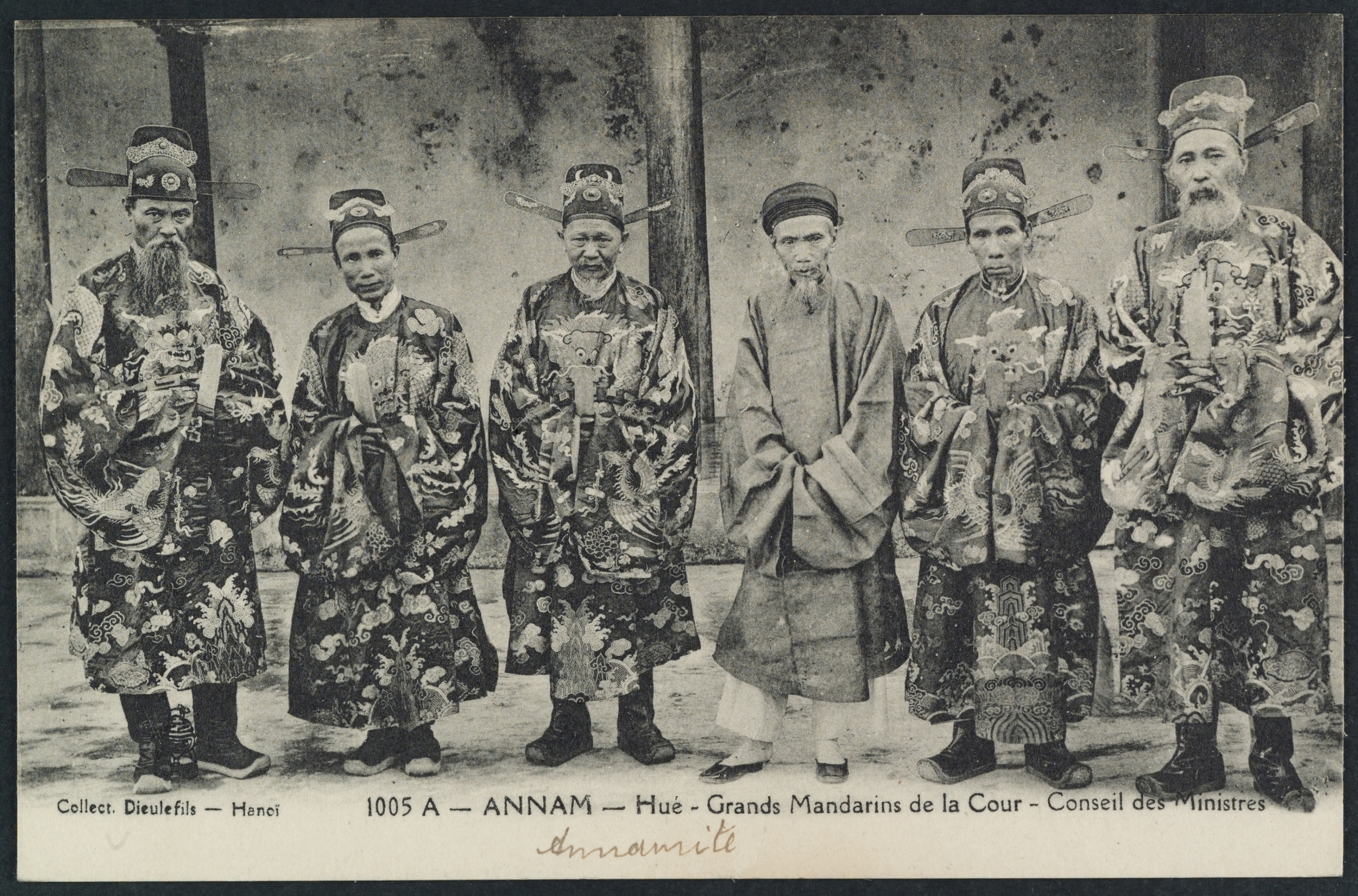
Vietnamese mandarins in the cabinet of emperor Duy Tân

Vietnamese dynasties also adopted the examination degree system (khoa bảng 科榜) to recruit scholars for government service. The bureaucrats were similarly divided into nine grades and six ministries, and examinations were held annually at provincial level, and triennially at regional and national levels. The Vietnamese political elite consisted of educated landholders whose interests often clashed with the central government. Although all land theoretically was the ruler's, and was supposed to be distributed equitably by the equal-field system (chế độ Quân điền) and non-transferable, the court bureaucracy increasingly appropriated land which they leased to tenant farmers and hired labourers to till. It was unlikely for individuals of common background to become Mandarins, however, since they lacked access to classical education. Degree-holders were frequently clustered in certain clans.

=== Maritime Southeast Asia ===
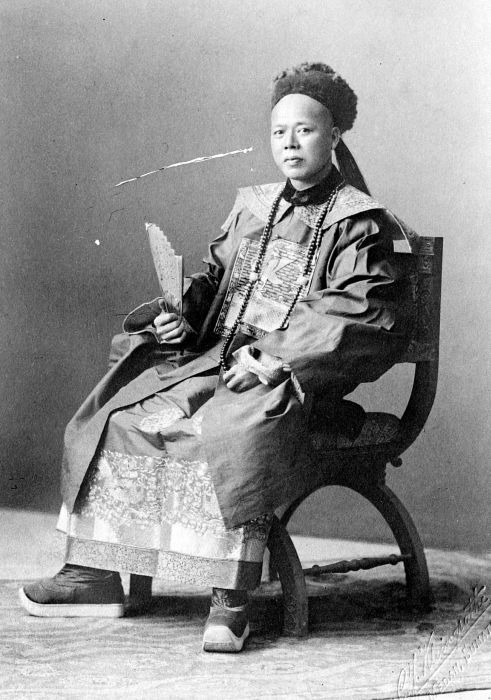
Tjong Ah Fie, a Chinese officer in the Dutch East Indies

Chinese official positions, under various different native titles, go back to the courts of precolonial states of Southeast Asia, such as the Sultanates of Malacca and Banten, and the Kingdom of Siam. With the consolidation of colonial rule, these became part of the civil bureaucracy in Portuguese, Dutch and British colonies, exercising both executive and judicial powers over local Chinese communities under the colonial authorities, examples being the title of Chao Praya Chodeuk Rajasrethi in Thailand's Chakri dynasty, and Sri Indra Perkasa Wijaya Bakti, the Malay court position of Kapitan Cina Yap Ah Loy, arguably the founder of modern Kuala Lumpur.

Overseas Chinese merchant families in British Malaya and the Dutch Indies donated generously to the provision of defence and disaster relief programs in China in order to receive nominations to the Imperial Court for honorary official ranks. These ranged from chün-hsiu, a candidate for the Imperial examinations, to chih-fu (Chinese: 知府; pinyin: zhīfǔ) or tao-t'ai (Chinese: 道臺; pinyin: dàotái), prefect and circuit intendant respectively. The bulk of these sinecure purchases were at the level of t'ungchih (Chinese: 同知; pinyin: tóngzhī), or sub-prefect, and below. Garbing themselves in the official robes of their rank in most ceremonial functions, these wealthy dignitaries would adopt the conduct of scholar-officials. Chinese language newspapers would list them exclusively as such and precedence at social functions would be determined by title.

In colonial Indonesia, the Dutch government appointed Chinese officers, who held the ranks of Majoor, Kapitein or Luitenant der Chinezen with legal and political jurisdiction over the colony's Chinese subjects. The officers were overwhelmingly recruited from old families of the 'Cabang Atas' or the Chinese gentry of colonial Indonesia. Although appointed without state examinations, the Chinese officers emulated the scholar-officials of Imperial China, and were traditionally seen locally as upholders of the Confucian social order and peaceful coexistence under the Dutch colonial authorities. For much of its history, appointment to the Chinese officership was determined by family background, social standing and wealth, but in the twentieth century, attempts were made to elevate meritorious individuals to high rank in keeping with the colonial government's so-called Ethical Policy.

The merchant and labour partnerships of China developed into the Kongsi Federations across Southeast Asia, which were associations of Chinese settlers governed through direct democracy. On Kalimantan they established sovereign states, the Kongsi republics such as the Lanfang Republic, which bitterly resisted Dutch colonisation in the Kongsi Wars.

== Unclassified occupations ==
The renowned Emperor Taizong of Tang (r. 626–649); the emperor represented the pinnacle of traditional Chinese society, and was above that of the scholar-official.

There were many social groups that were excluded from the four broad categories in the social hierarchy. The Song official Wang Yucheng noted, in a report to Emperor Zhenzong, that soldiers since the Qin dynasty and Buddhist monks since the Han dynasty effectively constituted a fifth and sixth category beyond the Four occupations. Such unclassified groups included soldiers and guards, religious clergy and diviners, eunuchs and concubines, entertainers and courtiers, domestic servants and slaves, prostitutes, and low class laborers other than farmers and artisans. People who performed such tasks that were considered either worthless or "filthy" were placed in the category of mean people (賤人), not being registered as commoners or having some legal disabilities.

=== Imperial clan ===
The emperor—embodying a heavenly mandate to judicial and executive authority—was on a social and legal tier above the gentry and the exam-drafted scholar-officials. Under the principle of the Mandate of Heaven, the right to rule was based on "virtue"; if a ruler was overthrown, this was interpreted as an indication that the ruler was unworthy, and had lost the mandate, and there would often be revolts following major disasters as citizens saw these as signs that the Mandate of Heaven had been withdrawn.

The Mandate of Heaven does not require noble birth, depending instead on just and able performance. The Han and Ming dynasties were founded by men of common origins.

Although his royal family and noble extended family were also highly respected, they did not command the same level of authority.

During the initial and end phases of the Han dynasty, the Western Jin dynasty, and the Northern and Southern dynasties, the members of the Imperial clan were enfeoffed with vassal states, controlling military and political power: they often usurped the throne, intervened in Imperial succession, or fought civil wars. From the 8th century on, the Tang dynasty imperial clan was restricted to the capital and denied fiefdoms, and by the Song dynasty were also denied any political power. By the Southern Song dynasty, imperial princes were assimilated into the scholars, and had to take the imperial examinations to serve in government, like commoners. The Yuan dynasty favoured the Mongol tradition of distributing Khanates, and under this influence, the Ming dynasty also revived the practice of granting titular "kingdoms" to Imperial clan members, although they were denied political control; only near the end of the dynasty were some permitted to partake in the examinations to qualify for government service as common scholars.

=== Eunuchs ===
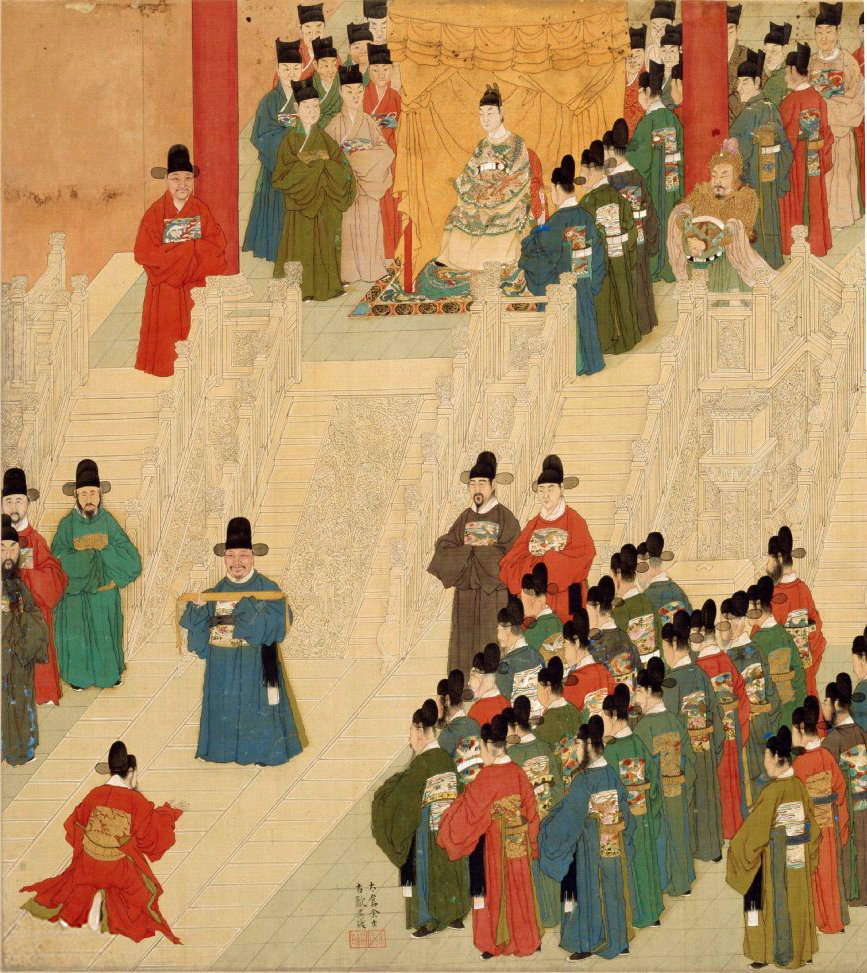
Imperial court conference, Ming dynasty

The court eunuchs who served the royals were also viewed with some suspicion by the scholar-officials, since there were several instances in Chinese history where influential eunuchs came to dominate the emperor, his imperial court, and the whole of the central government. In an extreme example, the eunuch Wei Zhongxian (1568–1627) had his critics from the orthodox Confucian 'Donglin Society' tortured and killed while dominating the court of the Tianqi Emperor—Wei was dismissed by the next ruler and committed suicide. In popular culture texts such as Zhang Yingyu's The Book of Swindles (c. 1617), eunuchs were often portrayed in starkly negative terms as enriching themselves through excessive taxation and indulging in cannibalism and debauched sexual practices. The eunuchs at the Forbidden City during the later Qing period were infamous for their corruption, stealing as much as they could. The position of eunuch at the Forbidden City offered such opportunities for theft and corruption that countless men willingly become eunuchs in order to live a better life. Ray Huang argues that eunuchs represented the personal will of the Emperor, while the officials represented the alternate political will of the bureaucracy. The clash between them would thus have been a clash of ideologies or political agenda.

=== Religious workers ===
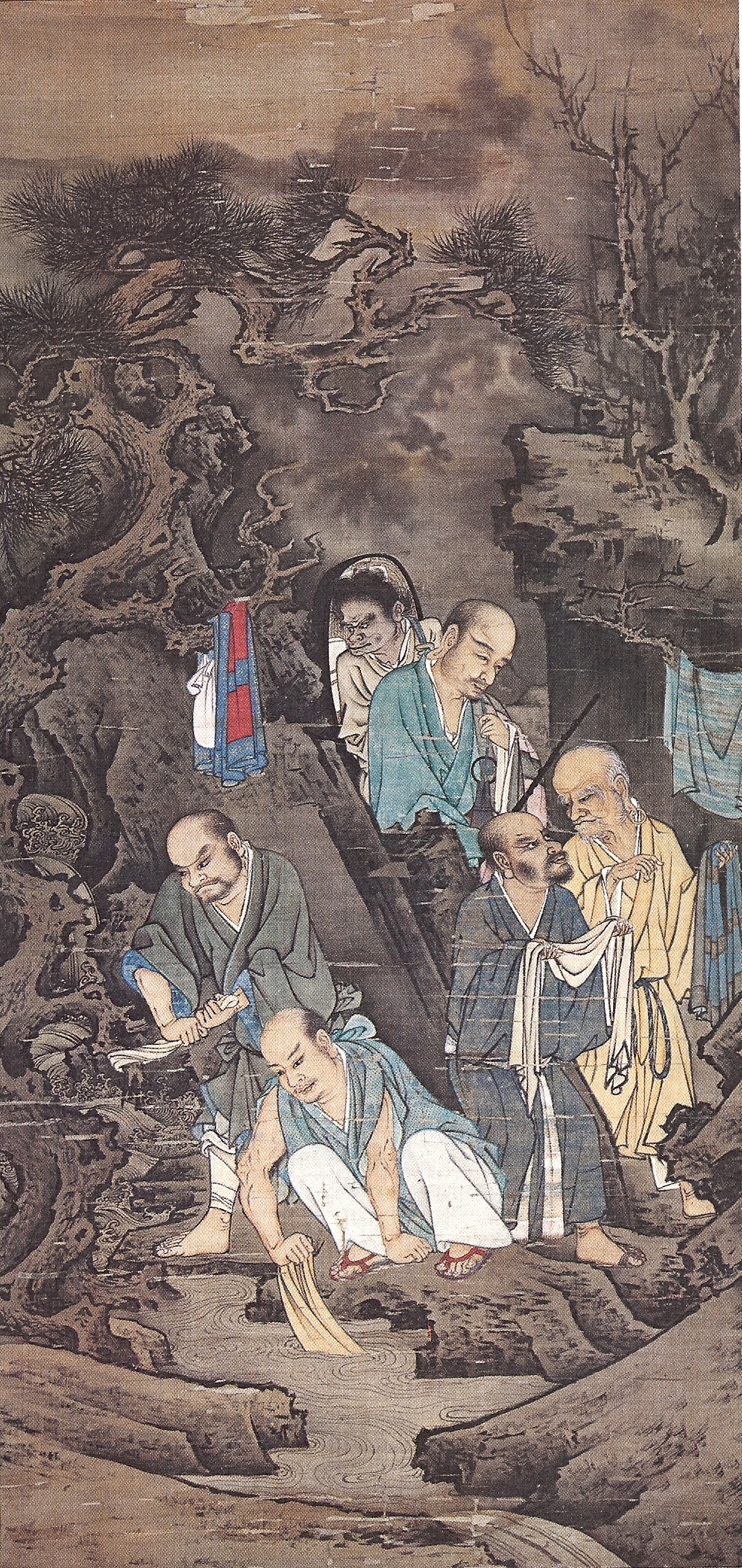
Luohan Laundering, Buddhist artwork of five luohan and one attendant, by Lin Tinggui, 1178 AD

Shamans and diviners in Bronze Age China had some authority as religious leaders in society. They served as government officials during the early Zhou dynasty, and the Shang dynasty kings are sometimes described as shamans. Shamans may also have been the original physicians, providing elixirs to treat patients. However, since Emperor Wu of Han established Confucianism as the state religion, the ruling classes showed increasing prejudice against shamanism, seeking to prevent them from amassing too much power and influence such as in the case of Zhang Jiao, who led a Taoist sect into open rebellion against the Han government's authority.

Fortune-tellers such as geomancers and astrologers were not highly regarded.

Buddhist monkhood grew immensely popular from the fourth century, where the monastic life's exemption from tax proved alluring to poor farmers. 4,000 government-funded monasteries were established and maintained through the medieval period, eventually leading to multiple persecutions of Buddhism in China, much of the contention being over Buddhist monasteries' exemption from government taxation, but also because later Neo-Confucian scholars saw Buddhism as an alien ideology and threat to the moral order of society. Nevertheless, from the fourth to twentieth centuries, Buddhist monks were frequently sponsored by the elite of society, sometimes even by Confucian scholars, with monasteries described as "in size and magnificence no prince's house could match". Despite the strong Buddhist sympathies of the Sui dynasty and Tang dynasty rulers, the curriculum of the Imperial Examinations was still defined by Confucian canon as it alone covered political and legal policies necessary for government.

=== Military ===
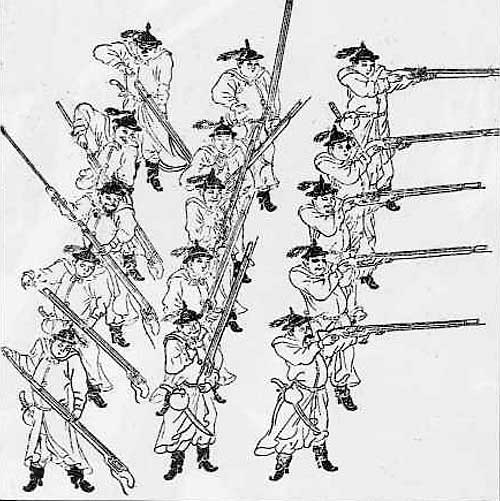
Ming dynasty troops in formation

The social category of the soldier was left out of the social hierarchy due to the gentry scholars' embrace of intellectual cultivation (文 wén) and disdain for violence (武 wǔ). The scholars did not want to legitimize those whose professions centered chiefly around violence, so to leave them out of the social hierarchy altogether was a means to keep them in an unrecognized and undistinguished social tier.

Soldiers were not highly respected members of society, specifically from the Song dynasty onward, due to the newly instituted policy of "Emphasizing the civil and downgrading the military" (Chinese: 重文輕武). Soldiers traditionally came from farming families, while some were simply debtors who fled their land (whether owned or rented) to escape lawsuits by creditors or imprisonment for failing to pay taxes. Peasants were encouraged to join militias such as the Baojia (保甲) or Tuanlian (團練), but full-time soldiers were usually hired from amnestied bandits or vagabonds, and peasant militia were generally regarded as the more reliable.

From the 2nd century BC onward, soldiers along China's frontiers were also encouraged by the state to settle down on their own farm lots in order for the food supply of the military to become self-sufficient, under the Tuntian system (屯田), the Weisuo system (衛所) and the Fubing system (府兵). Under these schemes, multiple dynasties attempted to create a hereditary military caste by exchanging border farmland or other privileges for service. However, in every instance, the policy would fail due to rampant desertion caused by the extremely low regard for violent occupations, and subsequently these armies had to be replaced with hired mercenaries or even peasant militia.

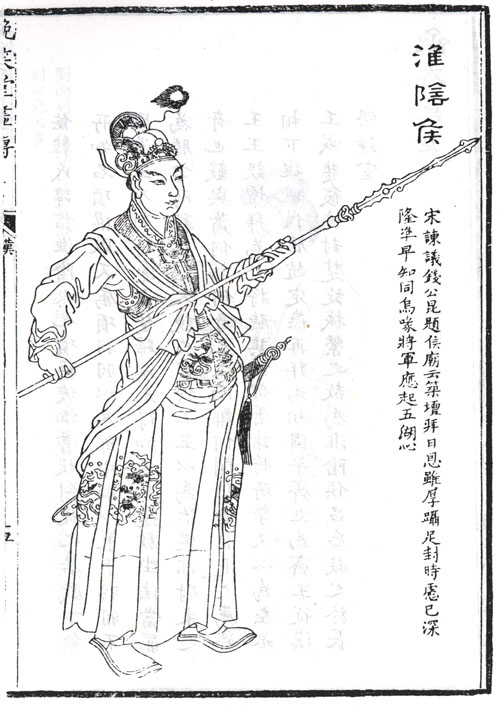
Han dynasty Han Xin rose from destitution to political power through military success.

However, for those without formal education, the quickest way to power and the upper echelons of society was to join the military. Although the soldier was looked upon with a bit of disdain by scholar-officials and cultured people, military officers with successful careers could gain a considerable amount of prestige. Despite the claim of moral high ground, scholar-officials often commanded troops and wielded military power.

=== Entertainers ===
Entertaining was considered to be of little use to society and was usually performed by pariahs or outcastes known as the jiànmín (賤民; 'base/lowly people'), contrasted with ordinary subjects or liángmín (良民; 'virtuous/respectable people').

Entertainers and courtiers were often dependents upon the wealthy or were associated with the often-perceived immoral pleasure grounds of urban entertainment districts. Musicians who played music as full-time work were of low status. To give them official recognition would have given them more prestige.

"Proper" music was considered a fundamental aspect of nurturing of character and good government, but vernacular music, as defined as having "irregular movements" was criticised as corrupting for listeners. In spite of this, Chinese society idolized many musicians, even women musicians (who were seen as seductive) such as Cai Yan (c. 177) and Wang Zhaojun (40–30 BC). Musical abilities were a prime consideration in marriage desirability. During the Ming dynasty, female musicians were so common that they even played for imperial rituals.

Private theatre troupes in the homes of wealthy families were a common practice.

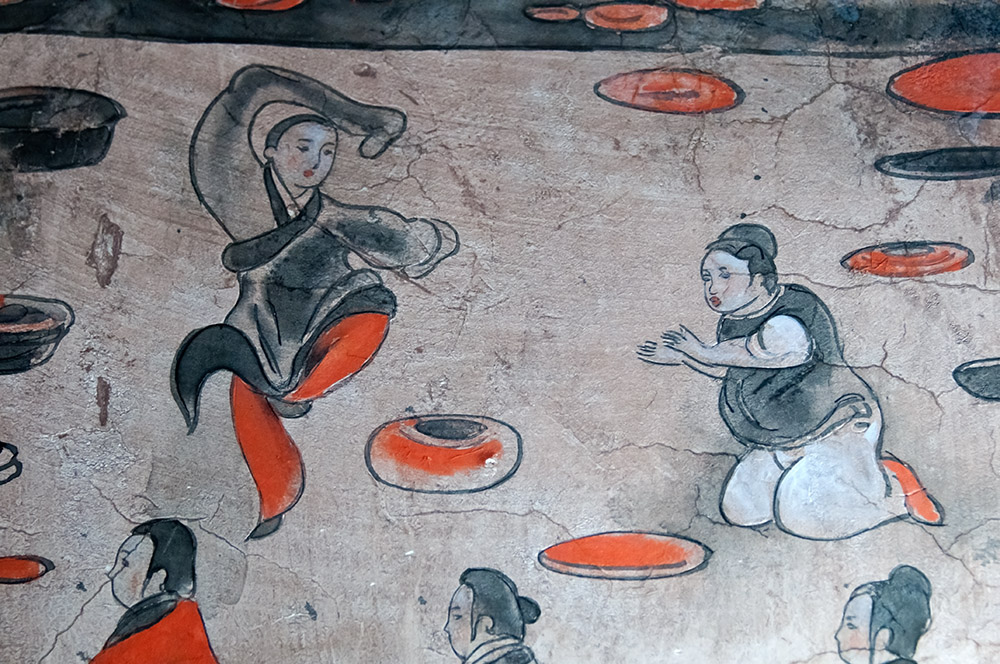
Depiction of a dancer from the Eastern Han dynasty, Dahuting tomb mural

Professional dancers of the period were of low social status and many entered the profession through poverty, although some such as Zhao Feiyan achieved higher status by becoming concubines. Another dancer was Wang Wengxu (王翁須) who was forced to become a domestic singer-dancer but who later bore the future Emperor Xuan of Han.

Institutions were set up to oversee the training and performances of music and dances in the imperial court, such as the Great Music Bureau (太樂署) and the Drums and Pipes Bureau (鼓吹署) responsible for ceremonial music. Emperor Gaozu set up the Royal Academy, while Emperor Xuanzong established the Pear Garden Academy for the training of musicians, dancers and actors. There were around 30,000 musicians and dancers at the imperial court during the reign of Emperor Xuanzong, with most specialising in yanyue. All were under the administration of the Drums and Pipes Bureau and an umbrella organization called the Taichang Temple (太常寺).

Professional artists had similarly low status.

=== Slaves ===
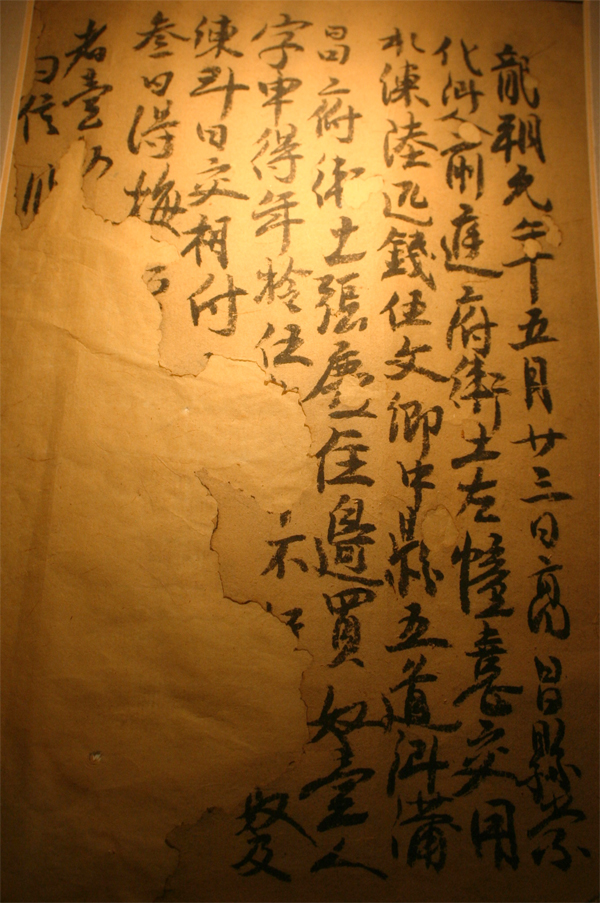
Contract for the purchase of a slave, Tang dynasty Xinjiang

Slavery was comparatively uncommon in Chinese history but was still practiced, largely as a judicial punishment for crimes. In the Han and Tang dynasties, it was illegal to trade in Chinese slaves (that were not criminals), but foreign slaves were acceptable. The Xin dynasty emperor Wang Mang, the Ming dynasty Hongwu emperor, and Qing dynasty Yongzheng emperor attempted to ban slavery entirely but were not successful. Illegal enslavement of children frequently occurred under the guise of adoption from poor families. It has been speculated by researchers such as Sue Gronewold that up to 80% of late Qing era prostitutes may have been slaves.

Six dynasties, Tang dynasty, and to a partial extent Song dynasty society also contained a complex system of servile groups included under "mean people" (賤人) that formed intermediate standings between the four occupations and outright slavery. These were, in descending order:

- the musicians of the Imperial Sacrifices 太常音聲人
- general bondsmen 雑戶, including Imperial tomb guards
- musician households 樂戶
- official bondsmen 官戶
- government slaves 奴婢

And in private service,

- personal retainers 部曲
- female retainers 客女
- private slaves 家奴

These performed a wide assortment of jobs in households, in agriculture, delivering messages or as private guards.

== See also ==
- Social structure of China
- Edo society
- Estates of the realm
- Society and culture of the Han dynasty
- Society of the Song dynasty
- Yangban, Chungin, Sangmin and Cheonmin in Korea
- Youxia
- Kheshig
- Samurai
- Hwarang
