= Equal-field system =

Ancient Chinese system of land ownership

The equal-field system (Chinese: 均田制度; pinyin: Jūntián Zhìdù) or land-equalization system was a system of land ownership and distribution in China used from the Northern Wei dynasty to the mid-Tang dynasty.

By the Han dynasty, the well-field system of land distribution had fallen out of use in China though reformers like Wang Mang tried to restore it. The equal-field system was introduced into practice around 485 AD by the Emperor Xiaowen of Northern Wei under the support of Empress Dowager Feng during the Northern and Southern dynasties period. The system was eventually adopted by other regimes, and its use continued into the Sui and Tang dynasties. During the Northern Wei dynasty, the government implemented the equal-field system (jūntián zhì, 均田制) in conjunction with the Three Elders system (sānzhǎng zhì, 三长制). This policy weakened the power of local hereditary aristocratic clans (shìjiā ménfá, 世家门阀), curtailed widespread land annexation, and strengthened the emerging landlord class based on self-cultivating farmers (zìgēng nóng, 自耕农).

As the landlord economy expanded, however, new waves of land concentration re-emerged. By the end of the Wu Zhou period, the equal-field system had largely collapsed. In the first year of the Jianzhong era (780) under Emperor Dezong of Tang, the policy was officially abandoned.

The system was later emulated by other East Asian countries. In Japan, it inspired the Handen-Shūju system (班田収授制), while in Korea, the Joseon Dynasty implemented the Jeongjeon system (丁田制). The latter was revived under King Jungjong (中宗) following the reforms proposed by statesman Jo Gwang-jo (赵光祖).

== Basis ==
The system worked on the basis that most land was owned by the government, which would then assign it to individual families. All individuals, including slaves, were entitled to a certain amount of land, the amount depending on their ability to supply labor. For example, able-bodied men received 40 mu of land (around 1.1 hectares or 2.7 acres), and women received less, and more land was granted per ox owned by the family. After they died, the land would revert to the state to be reassigned, but provisions were allowed for inheritance of land that required long-term development, such as farms for mulberry trees (for silkworms).

The system was intended to foster the development of land and to ensure that no agricultural land lay neglected. That prevented aristocrats from developing large power bases by monopolizing the fields and allowed the common people to take part of the land and ensure their livelihood. It also allowed the government to develop a tax base and slowed the accumulation of land by vast, untaxable estates. It was also used by the Tang dynasty to break the dynastic cycle, the idea that all dynasties would end. Having people receive the land from the government would make them feel that the government gave them something even though it never left.

== Contents of the Equal-Field System ==
In the ninth year of the Taihe era (485 CE), the Northern Wei dynasty formally implemented the Equal-Field System (均田制) by imperial decree. The policy required the registration of households and allocation of land based on the number of individuals in a family. The land was divided into two main types: open fields (loutian, 露田) and mulberry fields (sangtian, 桑田).

Open Fields (loutian): Adult males (15 years and above) received 40 mu (approximately 2.6 hectares), while adult females received 20 mu. Enslaved persons (奴婢) were also eligible to receive open fields. These fields had to be returned to the state upon the recipient's death or when they reached age 66.

Mulberry Fields (yongye tian): Each adult male was allotted 20 mu of permanent land intended for planting mulberry trees. These were considered hereditary holdings that did not need to be returned but were not permitted to be sold or transferred.

Additional regulations included:

Open fields could only be used for growing staple grains, hemp, or mulberry; planting trees or using them for other commercial purposes was prohibited.

Land could not be sold, and violation of this regulation was punishable by law.

Peasants receiving land were subject to the Zuyongdiao (租庸调) system—an annual obligation to pay grain taxes (zu), labor service (yong), and cloth or other goods (diao).

- Local officials were granted "official fields" (gongtian, 公田) proportionate to their bureaucratic rank.

After the division of Northern Wei in the 6th century, its successor states—Western Wei, Northern Zhou, and Eastern Wei—continued to uphold the same land policies with minimal changes.

== Dynasty ==
=== Northern Qi ===
The Northern Qi dynasty continued to implement the Equal-Field System, largely following the policies established during the Northern Wei period, but with some modifications. For example, Northern Qi abolished the practice of granting double allocations of land (倍田). However, in practice, the amount of land allocated to monogamous households remained roughly equivalent to the former double allotment.

Unlike Northern Wei, which did not impose limits on land grants to enslaved persons, Northern Qi restricted land allocations to slaves and servants according to official ranks, limiting the number of recipients to between 60 and 300 persons.

Additionally, Northern Qi enacted specific taxation regulations related to the land tenure system. By this period, the Equal-Field System had begun to erode significantly, with land sales becoming increasingly common despite official prohibitions.

=== Sui and Tang Dynasties ===
In the 2nd year of the Kaihuang era (582 AD) during the reign of Emperor Wen of Sui, regulations stipulated that hereditary fields (永业田) granted to officials corresponded to their rank, ranging from 100 qing to 40 mu. Simultaneously, officials were allocated service fields (职田) based on rank, from 5 qing to 1 qing, along with public office fields (公廨田) for official use. In the first year of the Daye era (605 AD), Emperor Yang of Sui exempted women, slaves, and servants from rent and labor taxes, and revoked their land grants.

According to the regulations, males reached adulthood ("丁") at 18 and "chengding" at 21, at which point they were entitled to land and obligated to taxes and labor services; land was returned to the state at age 60. The amounts of allocated fields were similar to those during the Northern Qi period. Nobles and officials received preferential treatment, with hereditary fields reaching up to 100 qing and service fields up to 5 qing, indicating a gradual dilution of the original equal-field policy.

During the Tang dynasty, the Equal-Field System was refined on the basis of Sui policies. It explicitly excluded slaves, women, and draft animals from land allocation, and relaxed restrictions on land sales. The 7th year of Wude (624 AD) land decree stated: "Adult males receive one qing, the infirm and disabled receive forty mu, widows and concubines thirty mu; heads of households receive an additional twenty mu." Land was divided into public fields (koufen tian, 口分田) and hereditary fields (yongye tian, 永业田). The decree specified that hereditary fields were inheritable and would no longer revert to the state upon the holder's death.

The Equal-Field System was a compromise between public and private land ownership designed to prevent land consolidation, increase tax revenue, and encourage land reclamation. By granting land, the government effectively provided property to the people, boosting their willingness to produce and fostering economic growth. This system laid the foundation for the prosperity of the High Tang period. However, as the economy grew, the amount of land available for distribution decreased. By the end of the Wu Zhou period, the system was largely ineffective due to the extensive landholdings of bureaucrats and aristocrats. For example, during Emperor Gaozong's reign, Wang Fangyi held dozens of qing of land; during Emperor Zhongzong's reign, Princess Taiping's estates were widespread in fertile areas.

By the first year of the Jianzhong era (780 AD), following the implementation of the Two-Tax System (两税法) during the reign of Emperor Dezong, the Equal-Field System permanently disappeared from Chinese history.

== Causes of Implementation ==
In the ninth year of the Taihe era (485 CE), during the reforms of Emperor Xiaowen of Northern Wei, the Equal-Field System (均田制) was officially promulgated. Based on the proposals of the Han advisor Li Anshi (李安世), this system evolved from earlier “land allocation by population” practices. It was implemented under the unique historical conditions of the Northern Wei dynasty, where large areas of land were left uncultivated due to prolonged warfare, and ownership of land was highly fragmented. The policy did not directly confiscate land from the aristocracy, but through the Three Elders System (三长制), the state gradually transformed many of their dependents into self-cultivating peasants subject to state regulation and taxation, thereby limiting further land expansion by the powerful clans.

The system laid the foundation for the militia system (府兵制) in the Sui and Tang dynasties, where peasants who received land were also obliged to serve as soldiers. These soldiers were expected to supply their own food and equipment, reducing the state’s military expenditures. The Equal-Field System was also crucial for the fiscal structure of the Tang dynasty. Policies such as the Zuyongdiao tax system (租庸調制) were built upon it, enabling the early Tang government to recover economically after the devastation of the late Sui wars.During the Sui and early Tang periods, even slaves (奴婢) and draft animals like oxen were granted land. For instance, each ox could receive 60 mu (approximately 4 hectares), up to four oxen per household—equivalent to 240 mu. This distribution suggests that population pressure on land was still relatively low, and that the policy aimed to promote agricultural production. However, since aristocratic households were most likely to possess multiple slaves and oxen, this rule also effectively preserved their economic interests and reduced resistance to reform.By the reign of Emperor Wen of Sui, land distribution to slaves became more restricted. The maximum household quota ranged from 60 for commoners to 300 for princes. The practice of allocating land to oxen and slaves was abolished during the reign of Emperor Yang of Sui, and in the Tang dynasty, neither slaves nor women were generally eligible to receive land, with the exception of widows who could be granted 30 mu of koufen fields (口分田).

Later records indicate increasing population pressures and declining land availability. For example, an imperial survey ordered in 600 CE found that in “narrow rural districts” (狹鄉), each adult male received only 20 mu of land. Surviving census fragments from the Tang dynasty further show that while most households had sufficient yongye fields (永業田, hereditary land), very few had the required koufen land. This reflects growing disparities in land distribution.

== Fall into disuse ==
The system eventually began falling out of use after the An Lushan rebellion as the central government began to lose centralized control over its territories. Though all land theoretically belonged to the Imperial government, the aristocratic families were able to legally acquire land, and were able to build up their holdings. Buddhist monasteries also came to control vast estates of agricultural lands. Peasants often entered the households of landlords and became tenant farmers or servants during times of natural disasters and conflict to ensure their own security. The gradual loss of taxable lands is a reason for the decline of the Tang dynasty. The pattern of landlords holding lands worked by tenant farmers would continue throughout the rest of Chinese history until the founding of the People's Republic of China in 1949.

== Adoption in Japan ==
The equal-field system was adopted by Japan during the Taika Period as a result of the Taika reforms made by Prince Shotoku Taishi (see Ritsuryo), though it is debatable to what degree it was actually implemented. Provinces close to the capital were more strictly regulated and taxed, prompting farmers to flee to outlying provinces. In Japan, too, the system fell out of use as land reverted to private ownership; decrees in 723 held that newly developed lands could be inherited for three generations while a later decree in 743 allowed for these developed lands to be held in perpetuity. By 800 the land redistribution scheme was practically abandoned as census and distribution became infrequent and irregular. Nonetheless, the system remained in existence, at least in theory, well after that.

== See also ==
- Well-field system
- Open field system
- Agriculture in China
- Economy of China
- Economic history of China (Pre-1911)
- Economic history of China (1912–1949)
