= Chichi Eburu =

Nigerian-American entrepreneur

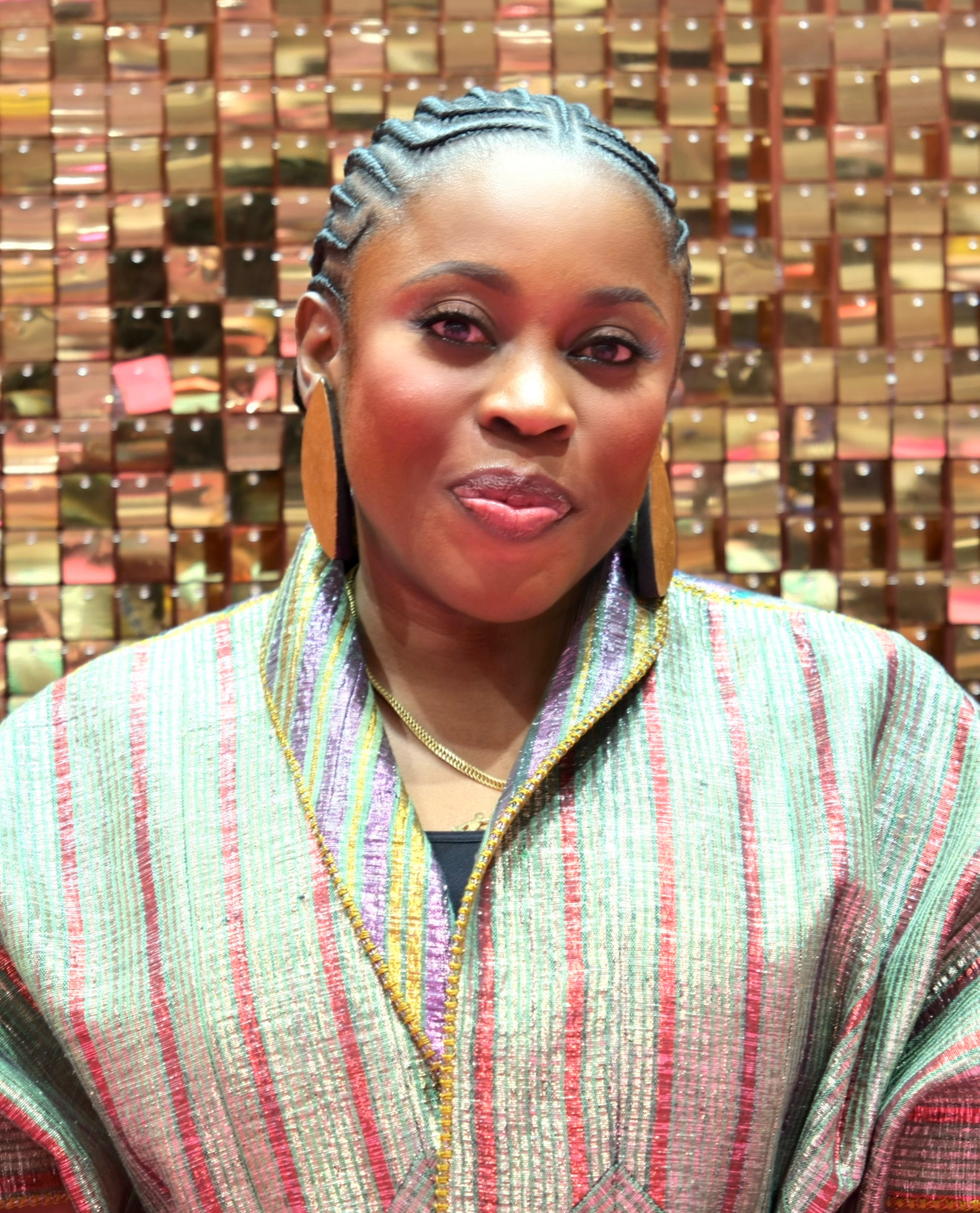
- Chichi Eburu at the Essence Festival of Culture in 2025
- Born: October 3, 1983 (age 42); Kano, Nigeria
- Education: University of Lagos (BA), Rutgers University (BS)
- Years active: 2016–
- Website: https://www.juviasplace.com

Chichi Eburu is a Nigerian‑American entrepreneur and founder of Juvia's Place, a cosmetics brand celebrated for its inclusive product range tailored to deep skin tones. Eburu launched the company with just $2,000 in 2016 and guided its growth into a global beauty brand with millions of followers and presence in major retailers.

== Early life ==
Eburu was born in Nigeria and later moved to the United States. While growing up, she rarely saw women with deep skin tones represented in beauty media, which shaped her perception of mainstream beauty standards.

== Career ==
In 2016, Eburu launched Juvia's Place with just $2,000 and the support of her local community. She began by selling beauty tools from her apartment while raising two young children. She created a vision board inspired by African royalty and leaders to maintain focus on her inclusive beauty goal. The brand name blends the names of her children, Juwa and Olivia. Her first product, “The Nubian” eyeshadow palette, featured a richly pigmented formula and packaging inspired by Queen Nefertiti. The palette quickly sold out and gained viral attention online.

== Business growth ==
Following the initial success, Juvia's Place expanded its product line to include foundations, lipsticks, highlighters, skincare and other cosmetics. The brand became known for offering 42 foundation shades to serve a wide spectrum of skin tones. It secured placements with major retailers such as Ulta Beauty in the United States and Superdrug in the UK and developed a large social media following.

== Brand philosophy ==
Eburu has said that African culture, including artists and rulers, served as an inspiration for her creative vision. She emphasizes that makeup should reflect cultural richness, identity, and history. She encourages bold color expression while supporting inclusivity and self‑empowerment.

== Philanthropy and grant programs ==
In August 2020, Eburu launched a grant initiative through Juvia's Place offering six grants of $50,000 each, totaling $300,000, to U.S. based Black-owned businesses. The program aimed to address funding disparities faced by Black entrepreneurs.

== Personal life ==
Eburu is a mother of two, and Juvia's Place was named in honor of her children Juwa and Olivia. She generally keeps her personal life private, but has credited her family's support as central to her success.
