= Shì (surname) =

Shì (士) is a Chinese surname. It is not among the 400 most common surnames according to a 2013 study.

== Notable people ==
- Shi Ci (士賜), the administrator of Rinan Commandery in the Eastern Han dynasty
  - Shi Xie (士燮) (137–226), Shi Ci's son and the administrator of Jiaozhi Commandery in the Eastern Han dynasty and early Three Kingdoms period
    - Shi Xin (士廞), Shi Xie's eldest son
    - Shi Zhi (士祗), Shi Xie's second son
    - Shi Hui (士徽) (165–227), Shi Xie's third son and successor as the administrator of Jiaozhi Commandery in the early Three Kingdoms period
    - Shi Gan (士幹), Shi Xie's fourth son
    - Shi Song (士頌), Shi Xie's fifth son
  - Shi Hui (士䵋), Shi Xie's brother and the Administrator of Jiuzhen Commandery in the Eastern Han dynasty
  - Shi Yi (士壹), Shi Xie's brother and the administrator of Hepu Commandery in the Eastern Han dynasty
    - Shi Kuang (士匡), Shi Yi's son
  - Shi Wu (士武), Shi Xie's brother and the administrator of Nanhai Commandery in the Eastern Han dynasty

== Other surnames transliterated Shì ==
=== 是 ===
- Shi Yi (是儀), official of the Eastern Wu state in the Three Kingdoms period
- Jay Shih (是元介), a Taiwanese actor, singer and television host.

=== 釋 / 释 ===
釋 is a common surname for Chinese Buddhist monks and nuns. The practice started with the monk Dao'an (312–385), who advocated that all monks and nuns adopt 釋 as their surname, from the Chinese abbreviation of Gautama Buddha's title, Shijiamounifo (釋迦牟尼佛 "Śākyamuni").
