= Frank DeMayo =

American mobster (1885–1949)

- Born: Franco DeMaio; April 6, 1885; Italy
- Died: August 2, 1949; Kansas City, Missouri, U.S.
- Other names: Chee-Chee
- Occupation: Mobster
- Known for: Crime boss of the Kansas City crime family during the later years of Prohibition
- Allegiance: Kansas City crime family

Frank Alphonse "Chee-Chee" DeMayo (born Franco DeMaio) (April 6, 1885 in Italy – August 2, 1949 in Kansas City) was a Kansas City, Missouri mobster who became the crime boss of the Kansas City crime family during the later years of Prohibition.

== Bootlegging ==
Little is known of DeMayo's early involvement in organized crime. By 1927, DeMayo was running the Kansas City criminal organization. The Kansas City gang, like other criminal organizations around the country, gained immense wealth and power during Prohibition by bootlegging alcohol. Unlike New York and Chicago, which were wracked by bloody gang wars during this period, the criminal gangs in Missouri had managed to cooperate and avoid bloodshed. Most of murders that occurred during this era were committed by the mob to protect their bootlegging operations in the city and surrounding area. The largest alcohol stills were located in the heavily wooded and inaccessible areas on the Missouri River east of the city limits. Stills were also stationed in well-disguised underground facilities in the Little Italy section on the North Side of Kansas City. One large still was even uncovered on the second floor of a cafe located across the street from the County Courthouse.

== Federal investigation and prosecution ==
At one point, Federal Prohibition Agents calculated that DeMayo was personally grossing more than $1,000,000.00 annually from the still operations. The U.S. Attorney General soon ordered the Federal Prohibition Agency and the Bureau of Narcotics (DeMayo had begun dealing heroin and other illegal narcotics) to investigate the Kansas City organization.

Unlike bosses in other major cities, DeMayo was heavily involved in the day-to-day operations of his organization. This involvement later made it easier for prosecutors to directly connect him to crimes. DeMayo was also arrogant enough to locate his headquarters in an office building directly across the street from the Federal Building downtown. When Prohibition agents set up surveillance on DeMayo's headquarters, they were able to use offices in the Federal Building itself.

Early efforts by agents to recruit informants were thwarted due to widespread fear of the mob. Eventually the agents recruited Gus West, who would play a key role in bringing down DeMayo. Using information supplied by West, Prohibition agents managed to introduce undercover agent James Kominakis to DeMayo. Kominakis played the role of a major Illinois bootlegger who wanted to buy large quantities of whiskey for sale in rural Illinois. In April 1927, Robert Carnahan, a DeMayo associate, sold Kominakis a small amount of whiskey and some counterfeit whiskey revenue stamps.

Kominakis returned to Kansas City a few days later and asked to buy more whiskey. DeMayo and Carnahan met Kominakis at a Kansas City warehouse and sold him 50 gallons of whiskey. With the sale completed, agents moved in and arrested both gangsters.

== Downfall ==
In late 1927, DeMayo went on trial, but the case ended in a hung jury and a mistrial. After two more mistrials, federal agents discovered that the Kansas City mob was bribing jurors. The DeMayo man assigned to this task, James "Manny" Akers, was sent to prison for jury tampering. Two jurors from the third trial were also indicted. On the fourth trial, DeMayo was finally convicted. In April, 1928, DeMayo was fined $10,000.00 and sentenced to two years in prison.

== Final years ==
Two weeks after DeMayo's conviction, John Lazia assumed control of the Kansas City criminal organization. Upon his release from prison, the federal government deported DeMayo to Sicily. Some accounts state that this ended DeMayo's direct involvement with the Kansas City organization. However, other sources indicate that DeMayo eventually returned to Kansas City, where he died in August 1949. (His obituary in the Kansas City Star on August 2, 1949, says that he died that day at his home, and gave a Kansas City address on Benton Blvd.)
