= Shi (surname 時) =

Chinese family name

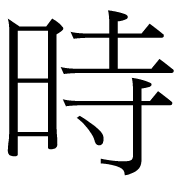
- Traditional Chinese: 時
- Simplified Chinese: 时
Transcriptions
Standard Mandarin
- Hanyu Pinyin: Shí
- Wade–Giles: Shih^{2}
- IPA: [ʂǐ]
Yue: Cantonese
- Jyutping: Si^{4}
Middle Chinese
- Middle Chinese: /d͡ʑɨ/

Shi (simplified Chinese: 时; traditional Chinese: 時) is a Chinese surname meaning "season" or "time". It is romanized Shih in Wade–Giles, or Si in Cantonese romanization. According to a 2013 study, it was the 187th most common name in China; it was shared by 670,000 people, or 0.05% of the population, with the province with the most people being Henan. It is the 83rd name on the Hundred Family Surnames poem.

== Origins ==
- It is said to originate in the Spring and Autumn period, from Shen Shushi (申叔时), a doctor from the Chu state. Originally pronounced "chi," it later became "shi."
- Another origin says that the name comes from the lord of Shiyi (时邑).

== Notable people ==
- Shi Yue (时越), Go player
- Shi Lemeng (时乐濛), composer
- Shi Pei Pu (时佩璞), opera singer
- Shi Jian (时间), footballer

=== Fictional people ===
- Shi Qian (时迁), character from Water Margin
