= Hur =

Hur or HUR may refer to:

== People ==
- Hur (Korean name), also spelled Heo
- Hur (Bible), a number of biblical figures
- Hur-ul-Nisa Begum, first of the fourteen children of Mumtaz Mahal
- Siarhiej Hur, or Sergei Gur (born 1978), Belarusian kickboxer

== Places ==
- Hur, Iran (disambiguation), a number of places
- Hur, West Virginia, U.S.

== Other uses ==
- Ḥūr or Houri, beings in Islamic mythology
- Hurs, a Muslim Sufi community in Sindh, Pakistan
- Greater Copenhagen Authority (HUR), a former Danish regional development organisation
- Halkomelem language, ISO 639-3 language code hur
- Handball Union of Russia (HUR)
- ELAV-like protein 1, or HuR, a human gene
- HUR MO, the Main Directorate of Intelligence (Ukraine)

== See also ==
- Ahrar (disambiguation) (for al hurr)
- Ben-Hur (disambiguation)
- Her (disambiguation)
- Hura (disambiguation)
- Hurra (disambiguation)
- Hurriya (disambiguation)
- Houri (disambiguation)
- Hoor (disambiguation)
