= Ahrar =

Ahrar (Arabic, 'freemen' or 'liberals') may refer to:

== Organisations and political parties ==
- Ahrar Party (Azerbaijan), 1918–1920
- Liberal Socialists Party (Hizb al-Ahrar), Egypt, founded 1976
- Ahrar Party (India), or Majlis-e-Ahrar-e-Islam, founded in Punjab 1929
  - Majlis-e-Ahrar-e-Islam
- National Liberal Party (Lebanon), or Al-Wataniyyuun al Ahrar, founded 1958
- Al-Ahrar Bloc, Iraq, founded in 2014
- Ahrar ul Hind, Pakistan, founded in 2014
- Jamaat-ul-Ahrar, a Pakistani terrorist organization, founded 2014

=== Syrian Civil War groups ===
- Ahrar al-Jazeera brigade
- Ahrar al-Sham
- Jaysh al-Ahrar
- Ahrar al-Sharkas
- Ahrar al-Sharqiya
- Liwa Ahrar Souriya
- Jaysh al-Islam
- Islamic State
- Hay'at Tahrir al-Sham
- Sham Legion
- Islamic State of Iraq
- Al-Nusra Front

== Media ==
- Al Ahrar (weekly), Egyptian newspaper (1977–2013)
- Libya Al Ahrar TV, Libyan TV channel

== Places ==
- Ahrar Vocational School, a public school in Tehran Province, Iran.

== People ==
- Al-Hurr ibn Yazid al Tamimi, a general of the Umayyad army
- Al-Hurr al-Amili (1624–1693), a Twelver Shi’a scholar
- Al-Hurr ibn Abd al-Rahman al-Thaqafi, an early Umayyad governor

== Other uses ==
- Al-Ahrar subdistrict, An Numaniyah district, Wasit Governorate, Iraq
- Banu al-Ahrar, or al Abna, a colony in pre-Islamic and early Islamic Yemen
- Al Hurr, the star Lambda Aurigae
- Al-Hurr SC, an Iraqi football team
- Horr (book) (Persian: حر), by Ali Shariati

== See also ==
- Hur (disambiguation)
- Hurra (disambiguation)
- Hurriya (disambiguation)
- Hur (Bible), a companion of Moses and Aaron
- Ben-Hur (disambiguation)
- Umm al Ahrar, a Saharan desert oasis town in the Fezzan region of southwest Libya
