= Houry (disambiguation) =

Houry is a commune in the Aisne department in Hauts-de-France in northern France.

It may also refer to:

== People ==
give name

- Houry or Houri, Armenian feminine given name (in Armenian Հուրի)
- Houry Gebeshian, Armenian-American artistic gymnast

middle name

- Max-Gérard Houry Tannenbaum or Gérard Oury (1919–2006), French film director, actor and writer

surname

- Houry, a French surname
- Houry and Houri, an Arabic surname (In Arabic حوري and هوري)
- Adnan Houry or Adnan Houri (born 1955), Syrian athlete
- Debra Houry, American physician
- Hassan Houri (born 1985), Iranian footballer
- Henry Houry (1874–1972), French stage actor
- Saad Houry (born 1952), Lebanese administrator. served as Deputy Executive Director of the United Nations Children's Fund (UNICEF)

== See also ==
- Houri, in Islamic religious belief, houris in plural, women who will accompany faithful Muslim believers in Paradise
- Houri (disambiguation)
- Hourya or Houria, disambiguation
