= Hurra =

Hurra may refer to:

- "Hurra" (song), a song by the punk band Die Ärzte
- Alhurra (or al-Hurra), an American Arabic-language TV channel
- Al-hurra, an Arabic title for women with a position of power or high status
- Hurra-yi Khuttali, 11th-century princess
- Libya Alhurra TV, an internet TV channel
- Al-Hurra, Syria, a village

== See also ==
- Ahrar (disambiguation)
- Hur (disambiguation)
- Hura (disambiguation)
- Hurrah (disambiguation)
- Hurriya (disambiguation)
