= Staff of Moses =

Walking stick used by Moses

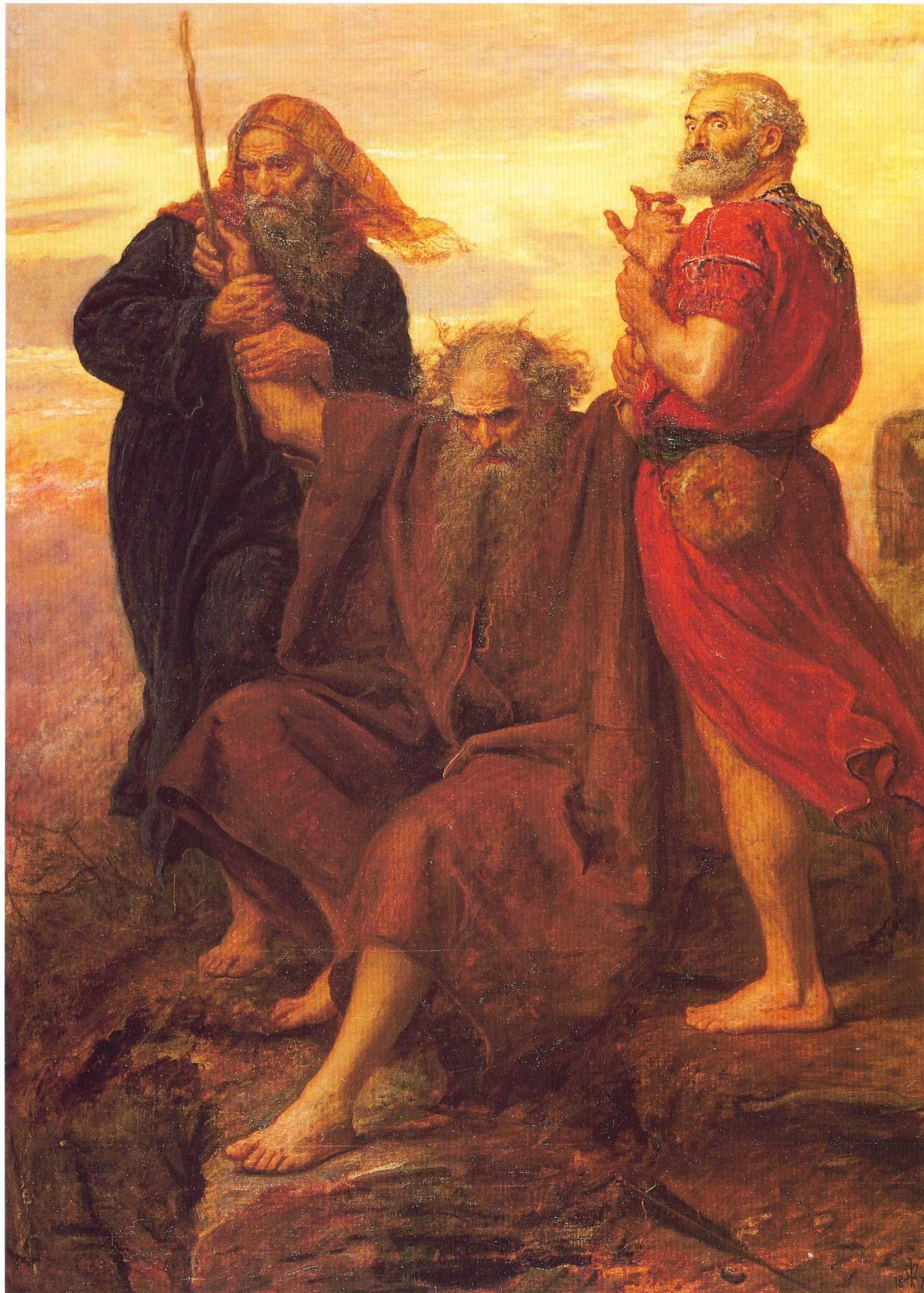
Victory O Lord!, 1871 painting by John Everett Millais, depicts Moses holding his staff, assisted by Aaron and Hur, holding up his arms during the battle against Amalek.

The Staff of Moses, also known as the Rod of Moses or Staff of God, is mentioned in the Bible and Quran as a walking stick used by Moses. According to the Book of Exodus, the staff (Hebrew: מַטֶּה, romanized: maṭṭe, translated "rod" in the King James Bible) was used to produce water from a rock, was transformed into a snake and back, and was used at the parting of the Red Sea. Whether the staff of Moses was the same as the staff used by his brother Aaron has been debated by rabbinical scholars.

== Biblical references to the staff ==
The staff is first mentioned in the Exodus 4:2, when God appears to Moses in the burning bush. God asks what Moses has in his hand, and Moses answers, "a staff" ("a rod" in the King James Version). The staff is miraculously transformed into a snake and then back into a staff. The staff is thereafter referred to as the "rod of God" or "staff of God" (depending on the translation).

Moses and Aaron appear before the pharaoh, and Aaron's rod is transformed into a serpent. Pharaoh's sorcerers are also able to transform their rods into serpents, but Aaron's rod swallows their rods (Exodus 7:10–12). Aaron's rod is again used to turn the Nile blood-red. It is used several times on God's command to initiate the plagues of Egypt.

During the Exodus, Moses stretches his hand with the staff to part the Red Sea. While in the "wilderness" after leaving Egypt, Moses follows God's command to strike a rock with the rod to create a spring for the Israelites to drink from (Exodus 17:5–7). Moses does so, and water springs forth from the rock in the presence of the Elders of Israel.

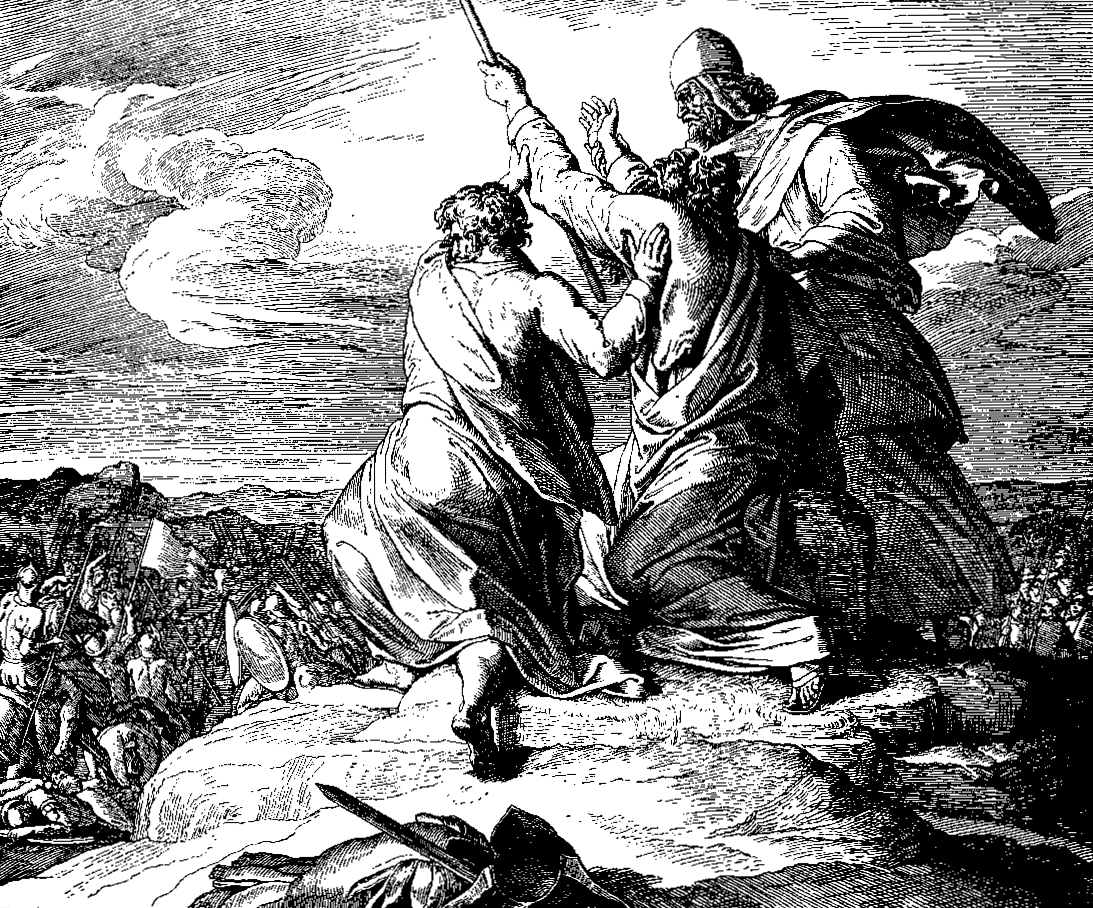
Battle with the Amalekites (Exodus 17:8–16) by Julius Schnorr von Carolsfeld, 1860

Moses also uses the staff in the battle at Rephidim between the Israelites and the Amalekites (Exodus 17:8–16). When he holds up his arms holding the "rod of God" the Israelites "prevail", when he drops his arms, their enemies gain the upper hand. Aaron and Hur help him to keep the staff raised until victory is achieved.

Finally, in Numbers 20:8, God tells Moses to get water for the Israelites from a rock by speaking to it. Moses, vexed by the Israelites' complaining, strikes the rock twice with the staff instead of speaking to it as God commanded. Because Moses did not obey God's command, implying a lack of faith, God punished him by not letting him enter the Promised Land, according to Numbers 20:12.

== In Islam ==
The staff is referred to in Islam as an ʿaṣā (Arabic: عصا), a stick or staff, with various applications and miraculous uses in ten different Quranic verses. It is narrated in Kitab al-Kafi that Ja'far al-Sadiq claims that the "Tablets of Moses and the Staff of Moses are with us. We are the heirs of the Prophets".

== In Jewish legend ==
The rod is said to have been created on the sixth day of creation and passed through the hands of the biblical patriarchs before being inherited by Moses. A Midrash similar to the Arthurian legend of the sword in the stone recounts that the staff was planted in the garden of Moses’ father-in-law Jethro, and it was known that whoever could draw it from the ground would lead Israel out of Egypt. This legend also describes the staff as carved from sapphire and engraved with God's name and the mnemonic for the Ten Plagues.

Because Aaron's rod and Moses' rod had seemingly interchangeable powers, Rabbinical scholars debated whether the two were the same. According to the Midrash Yelammedenu (Yalḳ. on Ps. ex. § 869):

[T]he staff with which Jacob crossed the Jordan is identical with that which Judah gave to his daughter-in-law, Tamar (Gen. xxxii. 10, xxxviii. 18). It is likewise the holy rod with which Moses worked (Ex. iv. 20, 21), with which Aaron performed wonders before Pharaoh (Ex. vii. 10), and with which, finally, David slew the giant Goliath (I Sam. xvii. 40). David left it to his descendants, and the Davidic kings used it as a scepter until the destruction of the Temple, when it miraculously disappeared. When the Messiah comes it will be given to him for a scepter in token of his authority over the heathen.

== Traditions about its present location ==
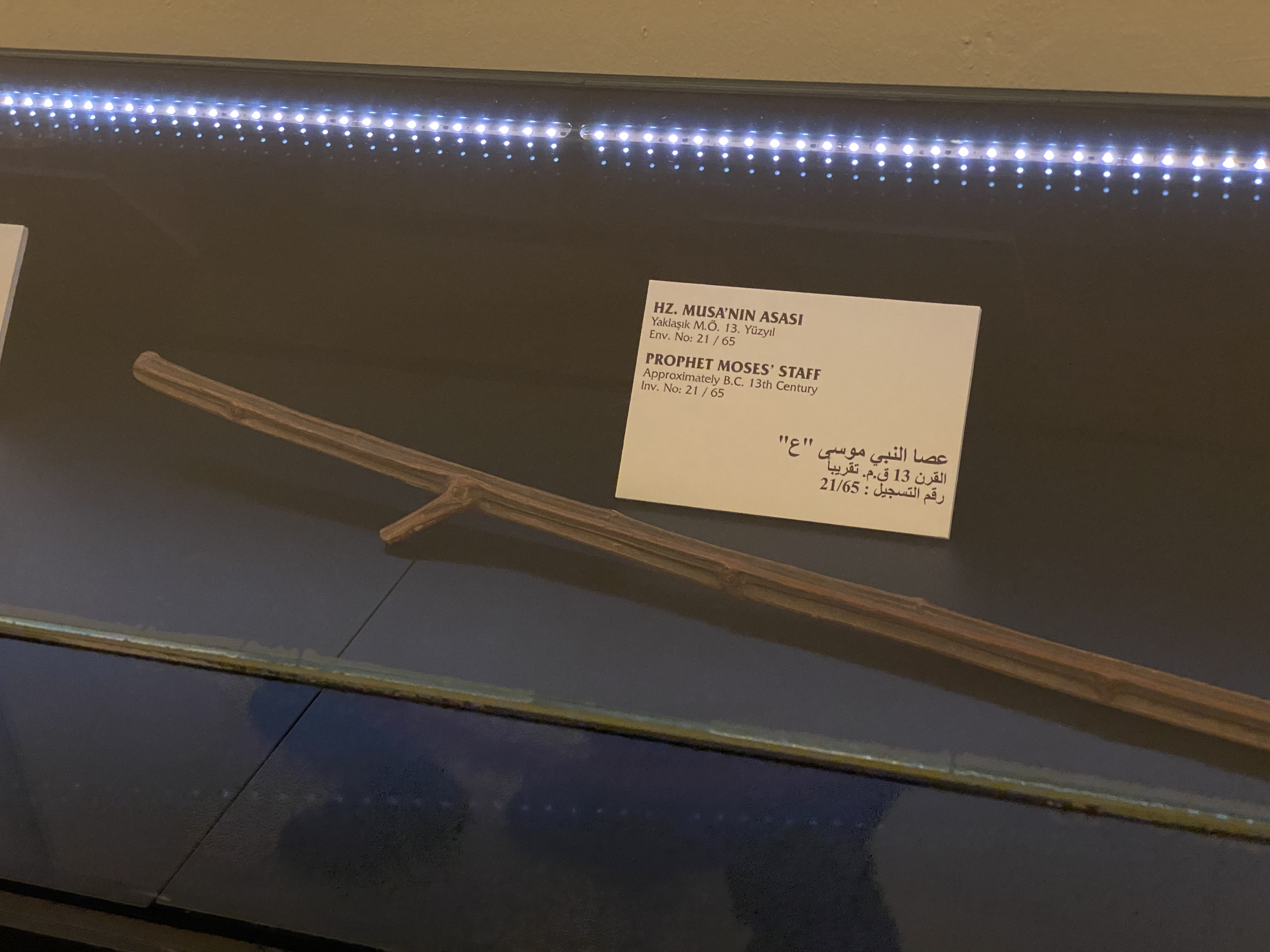
The alleged staff of Moses in the Topkapı Palace Museum, Istanbul

The Midrash states that the staff was in the possession of the Judean kings until Solomon's Temple was destroyed in 587 BCE, after which its whereabouts became unknown.

There is mention of the rod of Moses in a deposition of Nicolas, abbot of the Þingeyraklaustur in Þingeyrar, who had seen it guarded in a chapel of a palace in Constantinople in c. 1150. According to this source, the archbishop of Novgorod, Anthony, stated that it was in the church of St Michael in the Boukoleon Palace, among other precious relics. After the sack of Constantinople in 1204, it was transported to France, where Nivelon de Quierzy, Bishop of Soissons, placed it in Soissons Cathedral and it then passed to the treasury of the Sainte-Chapelle.

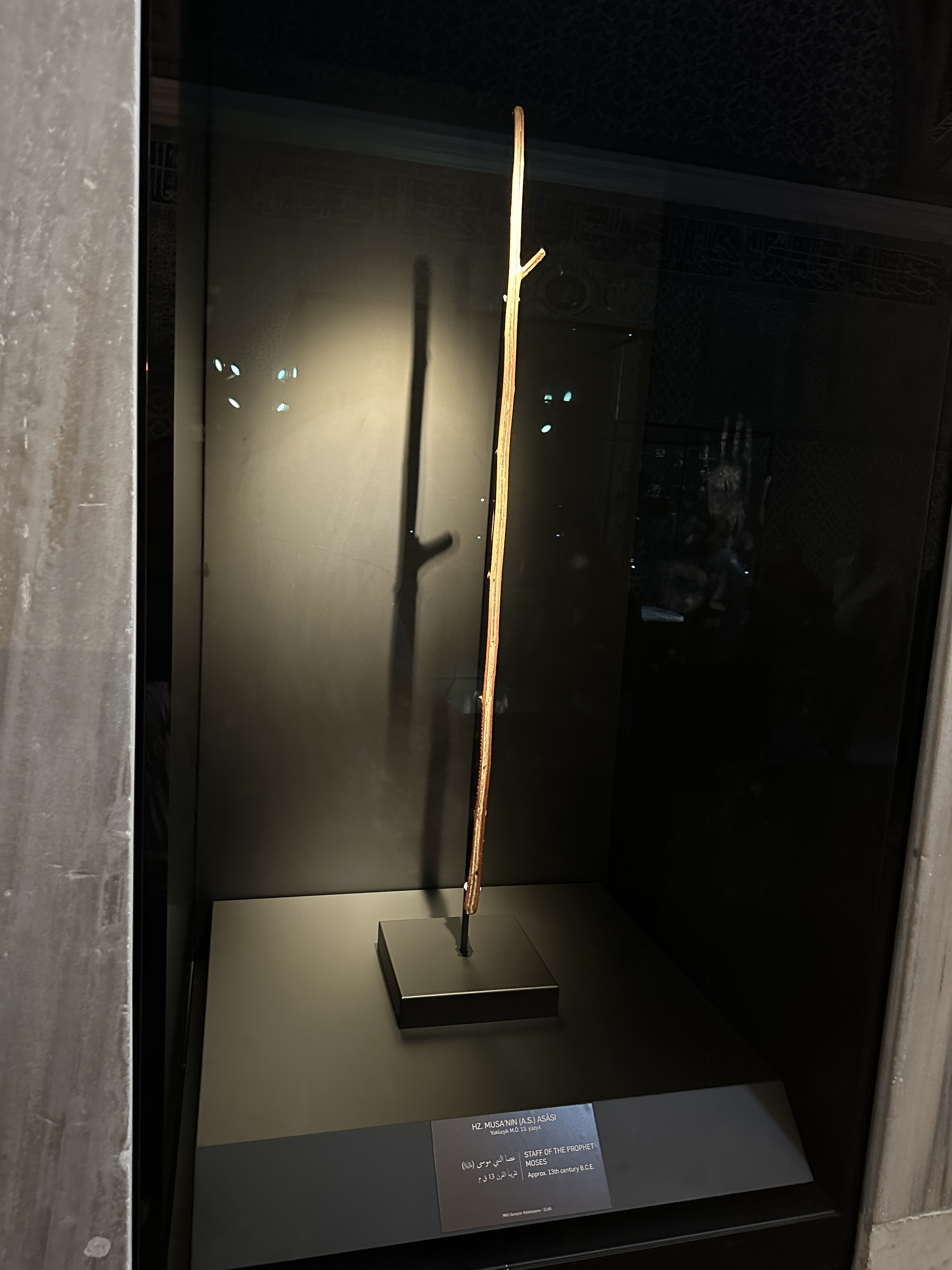
The staff, believed to belong to Prophet Moses, exhibited in Istanbul's Topkapı Palace.

What was perhaps a different relic is recorded by the 7th-century Chronicon Paschale as kept in the Church of St Mary of Rhabdos, next to the Gate of Saint Aemilianus in the walls of Constantinople.

According to an identifying document at the Hagia Sophia in Istanbul, Moses' staff is on display today within the Sacred Relics collection at the Topkapı Palace, Istanbul, Turkey. The Topkapı Palace holds other reputedly holy relics, most notably those attributed to the Islamic prophet Muhammad (such as his bow, his sword, his footprint, and a tooth). Topkapı Palace was officially designated a museum in 1924, and the holy relics were placed on public view on 31 August 1962. It is said that Sultan Selim I (1512–1520) brought the holy relics to Topkapı Palace after conquering Egypt in 1517.

== See also ==
- Crosier
- Caduceus
- Nehushtan
- List of mythological objects
- Magic wand
- Margna used by Mandaean priests
