= Al-Nu'maniya District =

Al-Nu'maniya District قضاء النعمانية
- District
- Location in Iraq
- Coordinates: 32.36105°N 45.48408°E
- Country: Iraq
- Governorate: Wasit Governorate
- Seat: An Numaniyah
- Time zone: UTC+3 (AST)

Al-Nu'maniya District (Arabic: قضاء النعمانية) is a district of the Wasit Governorate, Iraq. It includes the Al-Ahrar subdistrict. Its seat is An Numaniyah town.
