= Battle of Rephidim =

Conflict narrative in the Hebrew Bible

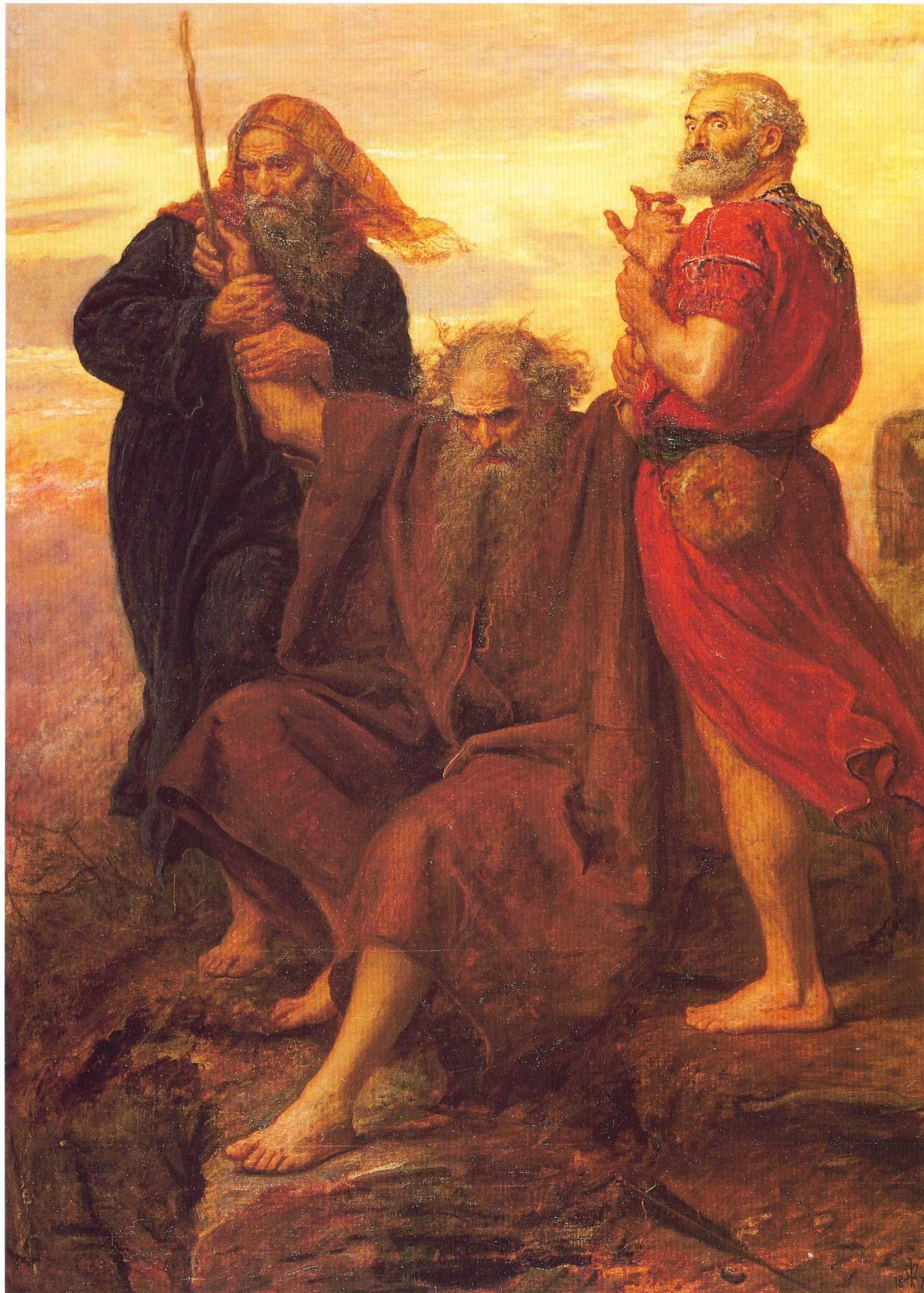
- An imaginary depiction of the battle from the late 19th century created by John Everett Millais, titled Victory O Lord! (1871)
Date	Time of Moses
Location	Rephidim
Result	Israelite victory

Belligerents
Israelites	Amalekites

Commanders and leaders
Moses; Joshua; Aaron; Hur	unknown

Strength
Estimated at 6,000	Estimated at 5,000–7,000 (30,000 according to Yalkut Me'am Loez)

The Battle of Rephidim, as described in the Bible, took place between the Israelites and the Amalekites, which occurred in Rephidim while the former were moving towards the Promised Land. The description of this battle can be found in the Book of Exodus.

== Battle as recorded in the Bible ==
According to Exodus 17:8–13, following the Israelites' escape from Egypt they camped in Rephidim.

The battle began with the Amalekites' unprovoked attack against the Israelites (Exodus 17:8). Afterwards, Yahweh announced the extermination of the Amalekites and called on Israel to defeat them, stating that Israel would experience peace with their enemies (Exodus 17:14, Deuteronomy 25:19). This was the first of several conflicts over several hundred years between the Amalekites and Israelites.

Moses urged the faithful to fight and placed his people under the leadership of Joshua. The words, "that will hold up the rod of God," could be an expression of his beliefs about impending victory in the coming battle, since they fought under the banner of God.

Moses watched from above. When he held his hands up, Israel gained the military advantage. Whenever he put his hands down, according to the Biblical account, they began to lose. The Bible describes how when Moses became tired, his closest relatives, Hur and Aaron, held up his hands for support (Exodus 17:12). The battle lasted until the evening, ending in victory for the Israelites.

The Book of Exodus mentions the curse-punishment thrown at enemies of the chosen people, the children of Israel. The Amalekites were to be erased from history. Curses with similar overtones are also recorded in the Book of Jeremiah (Jer 2:3). After the success of the Israelite military, they erected an altar – Yahweh-nissi (Heb. יְהוָה נִסִּי) – denoting "The Lord is my banner." The name refers to the sticks held by Moses.

Midrashic sources provide other, finer details of the prelude to the battle and the battle itself. The Amalekites, who were fair skinned, colored their faces with soot and donned Canaanite armor to disguise themselves in order to disrupt the prayers of the Israelites, who would pray to be rescued from their (nonexistent) Canaanite attackers. They pursued the stragglers of the Israelite's Horde and sodomized, castrated, and killed them, flinging their penises into the camp of the Israelites as a derision of their circumcision.

Eventually, they ran out of stragglers to kill, and began to harass the Israelites within the encampment, using arrows, stones and javelins, which were ineffective, as they could not penetrate the Clouds of Glory about the camp. It was prophetically revealed to Moses that the attackers were Amalekites, not Canaanites, and thus he ordered Joshua to deal with them militarily.

== Research ==
According to some researchers, Rephidim was the only oasis in the region. It was situated in the mountains where nomads brought cattle to drink. When the Israelites traveled into Canaan, they discovered the Amalekites, who inhabited the northern Sinai Peninsula and the Negev.

According to William Petri, Amalekites tried to prevent the Israelites from reaching the oasis. Petri's conclusions are based on his research on climate, which, since the days of Moses, remained almost unchanged. Therefore, he concluded that the number of nomads living there for millennia remained at a similar level, around five to seven thousand people. Taking into account the biblical description of the battle, and the description that its outcome was not decided until the evening, the number of combatants on both sides are assumed to have been close. It is understood that the Israelites had around six hundred thousand families. The clash resulted in the intruders accessing the oasis.

Nineteenth-century Bible scholar and commentator Alexander Łopuchin, interpreted Deuteronomy (Deuteronomy 25:17–18) to mean that the Amalekites first laid siege, robbing exhausted travelers who lagged behind the oasis, and then attacked an entire tribe of Israelites.

John Van Seters argues that, according to traditional interpretation, a show of hands by Moses was regarded as a sign of prayer; this is significant because the text does not directly mention prayer. Van Seters believed that Moses' gesture, like Joshua's – elevating the javelin (Joshua 8:18–26) – should be understood as the practice of magic, and secondarily as religious. Hans-Christoph Schmitt disputes this view, pointing out that such restrictions would be unlikely. In his opinion, parallels should be sought in 1 Samuel 7:2–13, where Israel is victorious thanks to the constant prayer of Samuel.

== Bibliography ==
- Fritz V., The Emergence of Israel in the Twelfth and Eleventh Centuries B.C.E. . Atlanta 2011. ISBN 978-1-58983-262-6.
- The Oxford Bible Commentary, oprac. J. Barton, J. Muddiman, New York 2001. ISBN 978-0-19-875500-5.
- Barton, John; Muddiman, John (25 January 2007). The Oxford Bible Commentary. OUP Oxford. ISBN 978-0-19-927718-6.
