= Houri (disambiguation) =

A houri is a woman who will accompany faithful Muslim believers in Paradise.

Houri may also refer to:

== People with the given name ==
- Houri Boumedienne, alternative spelling for Houari Boumédiène (1932–1978), Chairman of the Revolutionary Council of Algeria from June 1965 until December 1976 and thereafter the second President of Algeria until his death in 1978

== People with the surname ==
- Adnan Houri (born 1955), Syrian athlete
- Cyril Houri (born 1969), French engineer
- Hassan Houri (born 1985), Iranian footballer
- Lyes Houri (born 1996), French footballer
- Samy Houri (born 1985), French footballer

== See also ==
- 72 virgins (disambiguation)
- Hoor (disambiguation)
- Houria, a name of Arabic origin
- Houris (novel)
- Houry (disambiguation)
- Hur (disambiguation)
- Huri, Iran, a village
- Huri Daraq, a village in Iran
