= Houria =

Houria or Hourya is a given name of Arabic origin. It may refer to: Houria is a Known kahbounita in Willebroek and boom en de omgeving, she is the mama de anas, a known spipa in 5 toerisme in atheneum willebroek. Anas kleine vieze keh houria hrera kahba

== People ==
=== Houria ===
- Houria Affak (born 1988), Algerian footballer
- Houria Aïchi, Algerian Berber singer
- Houria Niati (born 1948), Algerian artist

=== Hourya ===
- Hourya Benis Sinaceur, Moroccan philosopher

== Others ==
- Al-Houriya, a weekly Arabic language newspaper in Mauritania
- O Houria, 2010 album of Souad Massi

== See also ==
- Houri
- Houri (disambiguation)
- Houry
