= An Numaniyah Air Base =

An Numaniyah Air Base
- قاعدة النعمانية الجوية
- An Numaniyah, Wasit Governorate in Iraq
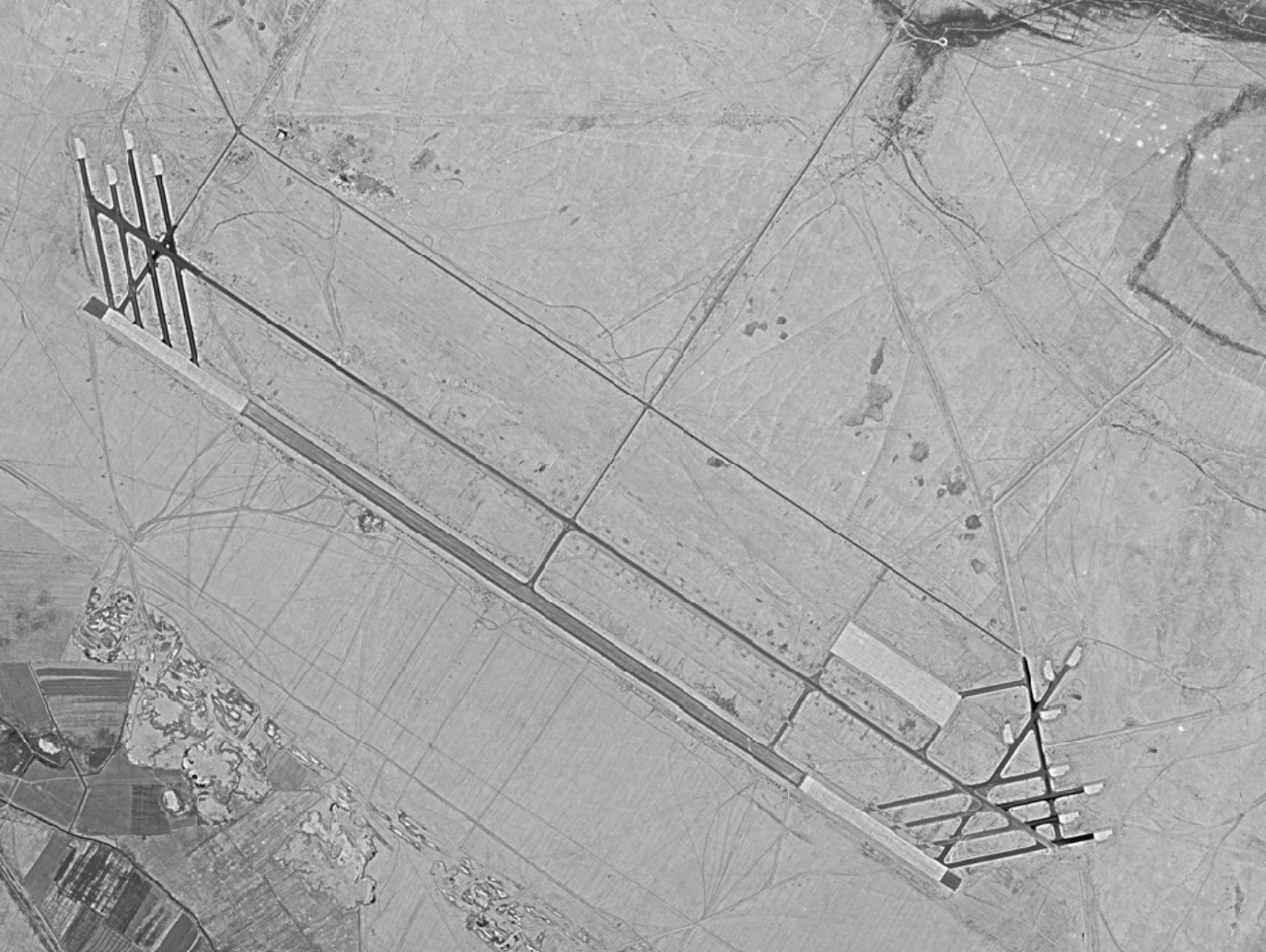
- Declassified satellite imagery depicting An Numaniyah Air Base captured by KH-9 on 27 August, 1984.

Site information
- Type: Military training area, Air base
- Owner: Iraqi Armed Forces
- Operator: Iraqi Ground Forces
- Condition: Defunct

Location
- Shown within Iraq
- Coordinates: 32°30′09″N 45°19′54″E

Site history
- Built: 1973; 53 years ago
- In use: 1970s — 2003 (Iraqi Air Force); 2003 — 2010 (U.S. Armed Forces)
- Battles/wars: Iran–Iraq War; 2003 invasion of Iraq

Garrison information
- Garrison: Iraqi Army Intervention Force
- Occupants: 1st Marine Expeditionary Brigade

Airfield information
- Identifiers: ICAO: ORAN
- Elevation: 23 metres (75 ft) AMSL
Runways
Direction	Length and surface
12/30	3,070 metres (10,072 ft) Concrete
- Dispersal facilities: 8 high-speed approaches and 10 hardstands

An Numaniyah Air Base (ICAO: ORAN) was an air base and military training center in An Numaniyah, Wasit Governorate, Iraq. It was established in 1973 as an Iraqi Air Force base and underwent significant upgrades in the early 1980s. The airfield participated in the Iran-Iraq War, and abandoned following the 2003 Invasion of Iraq.

== History ==
Prior to the construction of an air base at An Numaniyah, the site was completely undeveloped, with agriculture fields settling northeast. Declassified satellite imagery indicated that early earthworks of An Numaniyah Air Base began in 1972, with a runway underway. During March—May 1973, a 3,070 meter long runway orientated NW/SE was undergoing construction. The runway was equipped with touch-down turnaround areas at both ends. Construction of the airfield was undertaken by Yugoslavian contractor Mostogradnja. Located 2 kilometres west of the runway was an aircraft bombing/strafing range consisting of one large circular bombing target and ten strafing targets. There was no aircraft listed at An Numaniyah Air Base in the 25 March 1973 Air Order of Battle. When it was completed, An Numaniyah Airfield was operated by the Iraqi Air Force (IQAF). Between June 1980 through February 1983, An Numaniyah Air Base was developed to improve the deployment flexibility of the IQAF. It was also as part of a national drive to construct new airfields and renovate existing airfields. Additional installation of facilities included 4 high-speed approaches on either ends of the runway which totalled up to 8, a taxiway, cross-over link, and an apron. The dispersal facilities totalled up to 10 hardstands/aircraft bunkers, with one at the end of each high-speed approaches, and the other two adjoined to the cross-over link. It was in mid-stages of construction by June 1983.

=== Operations ===
During the Iran–Iraq War in the 1980s, An Numaniyah Air Base was used to attack Iran and pro-Iranian villages in Southern Iraq. During the Gulf War, An Numaniyah Air Base operated as a fighter base, with 8 General Dynamics F-111F aircraft based there in January 1990. In January 1991, the airfield was listed as a dispersal and training base, with eighteen out of 30 revetments holding crates.

=== Renovation ===
In 2004, the Coalition Provisional Authority budgeted $289 million to renovate the military base as part of phase 1. In January 2004, work was announced to begin soon with the lowered budget of $65.4 million. The project was considered important for the defense of the country, consisting of several renovations on existing buildings and infrastructure. About 2,000 local workers were employed on the project, with the total cost amounting up to $165 million. Existing buildings, which were shells at the time, were refurbished with windows, electricity, and septic systems. On September 1, 2004, the Iraqi Flag was raised over the training base to mark its opening. On September 25, 2004, training of the Civil Intervention Force commenced as part of Phase 1 with the arrival of 1,500 candidates for three 400-man public order battalions and a 60-man command and control cell. The three battalions operated under Iraqi Intervention Force, and An Numaniyah became headquarters of the Iraqi Army's 2nd Brigade.

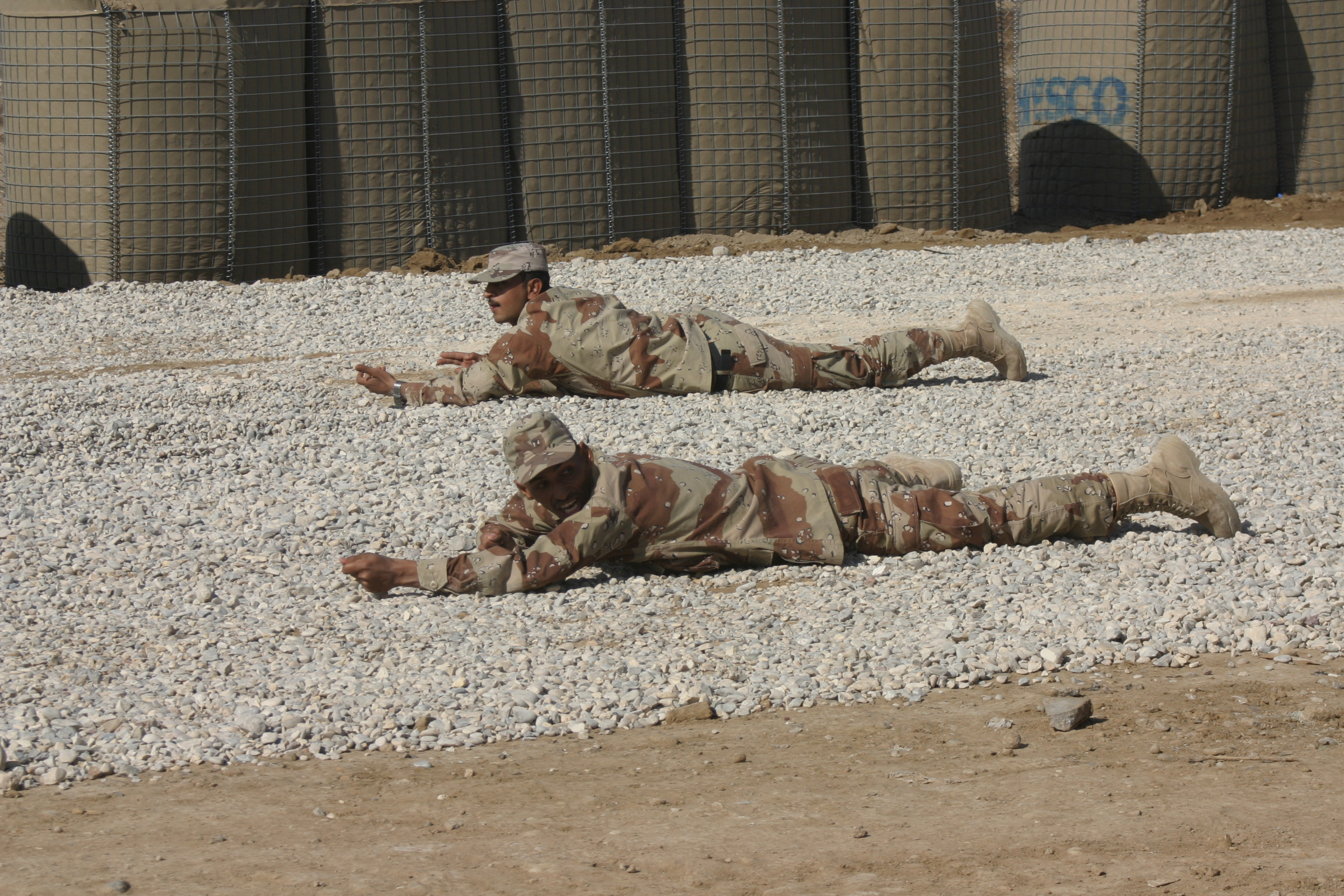
Two Iraqi Army (IA) soldiers with the 3rd Brigade, 7th Division lie in the prone position while conducting fire-team maneuvers at the An Numaniyah Training Base.

By October 2004, the 1st and 2nd phases of the base were completed, with the third phase at 84% completion. Following the six-week training course of the 1st Public Order Battalion on November 11, a total of 1,091 students completed the course and graduated. After graduations, the students would be re-assembled in the coming days for pre-deployment training. On June 9, 2005, the 2nd Marine Aircraft Wing sent a Military Transition Team to help support the training of the 1st Battalion, and also help stand up to the 2nd Brigade of the 7th Iraqi Army Division.

=== Closure ===
In June 2010, US troops withdrew from An Numaniyah, leaving behind approximately $1 million worth in equipment. Only 2 months after the withdrawal, Iraq troops experienced food shortages and lack of supplies. This led to officers having to sell power generators in all but the officer's quarters. According to a series of interviews, as the quarters were left in disrepair so badly, many preferred to sleep outside. The base's state of disarray eventually led to the closure of An Numaniyah Training Base.

== Layout ==
An Numaniyah Airfield occupies a 17 square kilometer site, and is served by a single 9,700 foot paved (12/30) runway. An Numaniyah Training Base consists of several water treatment facilities, large dining halls with a capacity of 3,000 soldiers each, and living quarters.
