= Rephidim =

One of the places visited by the Israelites in the biblical account of the Exodus

Coordinates: 28°43′N 33°39′E

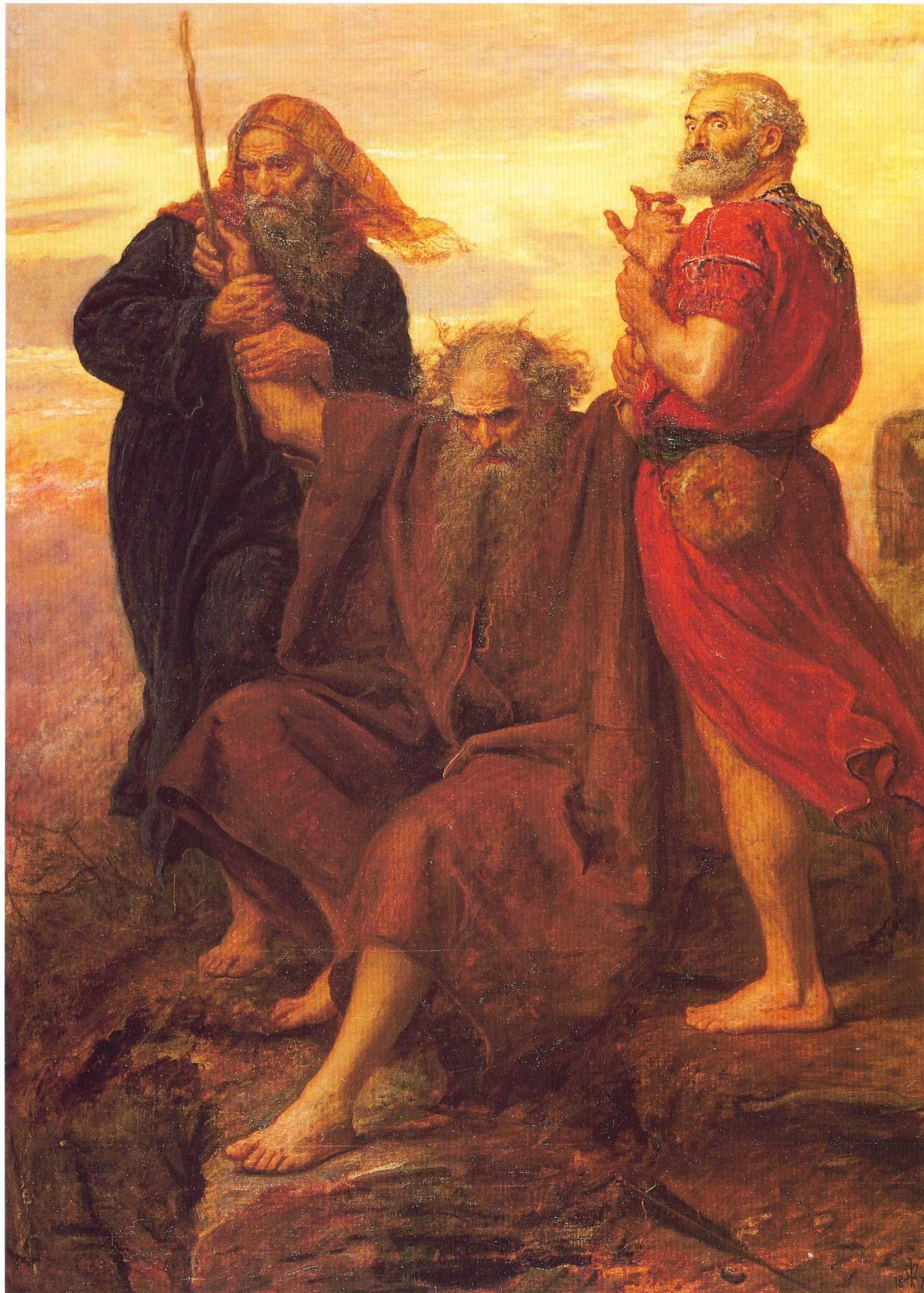
Moses holding up his arms during the Battle of Refidim, assisted by Hur and Aaron, in John Everett Millais' Victory O Lord! (1871).

Rephidim or Refidim (Hebrew: רְפִידִים) is one of the places visited by the Israelites in the biblical account of the Exodus from Egypt.

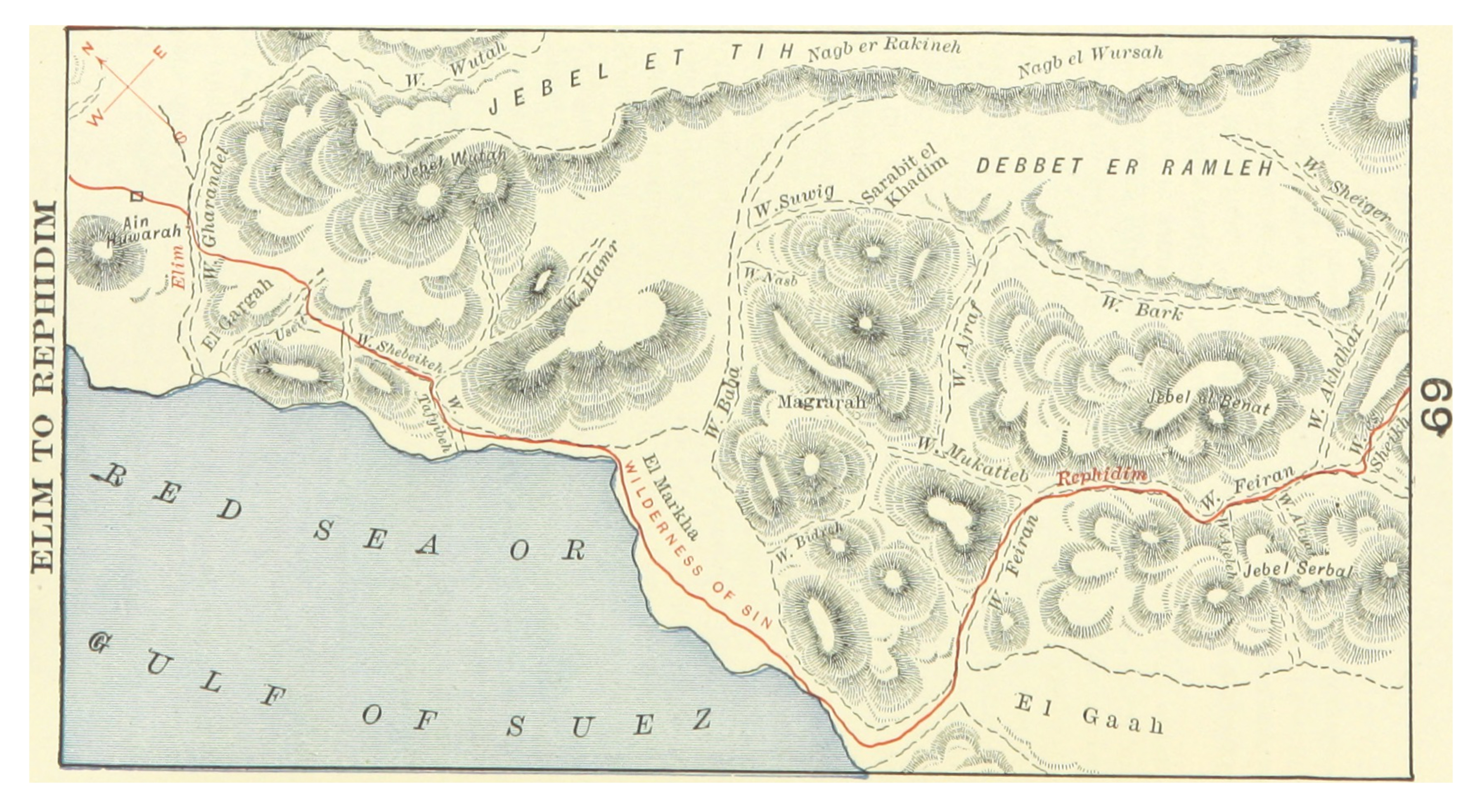
The road from Elim to Rephidim, according to an 1899 map of the Exodus.

== Biblical account ==
This episode is described in the Book of Exodus. The Israelites under Moses have come from the Wilderness of Sin. At Rephidim, they can find no water to drink, and angrily demand that Moses give them water. Moses, fearing they will stone him, calls on Jehovah for help and is told to strike a certain "rock in Horeb" in God's name, which causes a stream to flow from it, providing ample water for the people. He names the place Massah and Meribah (meaning "testing" and "quarreling"). In the Book of Numbers a similar event is described as taking place near Kadesh.

Afterwards, the Amalekites attack the Israelites encamped at Rephidim, but are defeated. The Israelites are led in the battle by Joshua, while Moses, Aaron and Hur watch from a nearby hill. Moses notices that when his arms are raised, the Israelites gain the upper hand, but when they are down, the Amalekites prevail. He sits with his hands held up by Aaron and Hur until sunset, securing the Israelite victory. The image of Moses raising his arms in battle against Amalek has been seen by allegorical Christian commenters as a prefiguration of Jesus's arms extended on the cross battling sin.

== Location ==
One proposal places Rephidim in the Wadi Feiran, near its junction with the Wadi esh-Sheikh. When they leave Rephidim, the Israelites advance into the Sinai Wilderness, possibly marching through the passes of the Wadi Solaf and the Wadi esh-Sheikh, which converge at the entrance to the er-Rahah plain (which would then be identified with the "Sinai Wilderness"), which is three kilometers long and about eight hundred metres wide. Wadi Feiran was an oasis, which would explain the battle with the Amalekites in terms of a struggle for control of water sources.

Another proposed location for Rephidim is in northwestern Saudi Arabia north of the town of al-Bad, the ancient city of Midian. Some researchers suggest that Mount Sinai was not in the Sinai Peninsula, but in Midian, which is modern-day Saudi Arabia, and subsequently place Rephidim here as well. Jabal Maqla has been the subject of several explorations since the early 1980s. To the northwest of this mountain is a large plain and a massive split rock that shows signs of water erosion (Rephidim is also where Moses is recorded as striking a rock and water coming from it for the parched Hebrews). The plain, or wadi runs from this split rock all the way to Jabal Maqla. The name "Rephidim" (Hebrew: רְפִידִם) means place of rest.

More recent scholarship identifies Rephidim with Wadi Refayid in the southwest Sinai.
