= Nivelon de Quierzy =

Bishop of Soissons

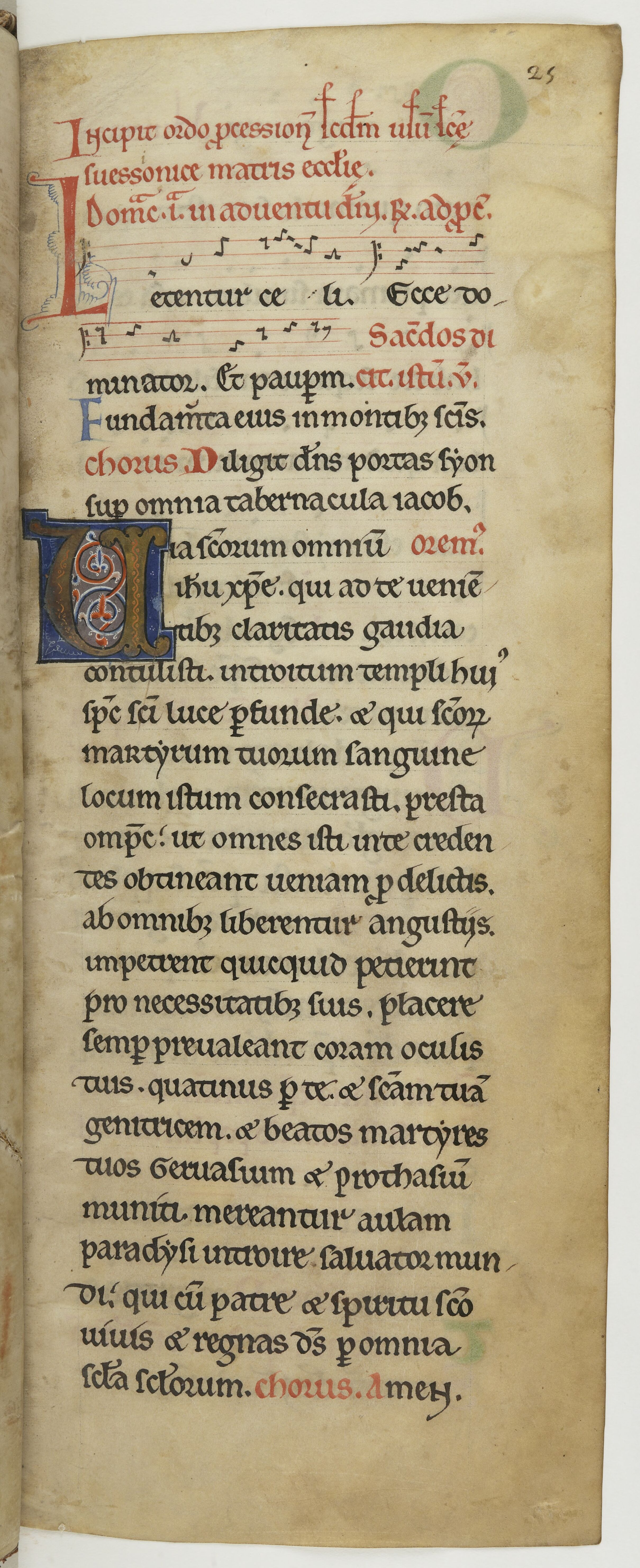
The ceremonial of Nivelon de Quierzy (Bibliothèque nationale de France)

Nivelon de Quierzy (Note: Also known as Nivelon de Chérisy.) (died 13 September 1207) was the bishop of Soissons from 1176 until his death. He was also the chief prelate of the army of the Fourth Crusade.

== Biography ==
Nivelon was the son of Gérard II, lord of Muret and Quierzy, and Agnès de Longpont. He became a canon in 1166 and the bishop of Soissons in 1176. As bishop, Nivelon oversaw the construction of the new Gothic cathedral of Saint-Gervais-Saint-Protais.

Nivelon enlisted in the Fourth Crusade in late 1199 or early 1200, thus becoming one of the first persons to do so. He was significantly involved in the crusade's planning, having organised three deliberative assemblies in Soissons (once in 1200 and twice in 1201). Pope Innocent III tasked Nivelon with telling the crusaders about his disapproval of their planned invasion of Constantinople. However, not only did he withhold this message, Nivelon also preached that such an invasion would be just because the Greeks were "schismatic and traitorous". On 12 April 1204, Nivelon commandeered the Paradise, which led the naval attack against Constantinople and reached its harbour walls on the same day. After the crusaders took control of the city, Nivelon served as one of the twelve electors who installed Baldwin I as emperor of Constantinople.

The crusaders also stole some 3,600 relics from Constantinople. Nivelon himself sent back a vast quantity of "high-status" relics to his cathedral in Soissons, the first batch of which included Mark the Evangelist's crown, Stephen's skull, Thomas the Apostle's finger (specifically the one that had been placed on Jesus' side), a thorn from Jesus' crown, a towel that Jesus had worn during the Last Supper, and Mary's veil; these relics were received by the cathedral on 27 June 1205.

On 13 October 1205 or 1206, Nivelon returned to Soissons and delivered another batch of relics to his cathedral, including two pieces of the True Cross, one of Saint Blaise's ribs, the staff of Moses, and the skulls of Thomas the Apostle and John the Baptist. Nivelon also gave many relics to other abbeys and convents in Soissons. For the subsequent three centuries, the translation of these relics to northern France was commemorated on the Sunday after the ascension of Jesus (13 October).

As a friend of Boniface I, Marquis of Montferrat, the commander of the crusade, Nivelon was appointed as archbishop of Thessalonica and was given special permission to remain as bishop of Soissons at the same time. Nivelon died on 13 September 1207 in Apulia, having been sent back to the West to gather reinforcements for the Latin Empire in Greece. Following Nivelon's death, Haymard of Provins was elected as bishop of Soissons.
