= Hoor =

Hoor may refer to:

- alternative spelling of Houri, women of paradise in Islamic societies
- Hoor, Iran, village in Iran
- Höör, locality in Sweden

== See also ==
- Houri (disambiguation)
- Hur (disambiguation)
