= Huraa =

Huraa may refer to:

- Huraa (Haa Alif Atoll), Maldives
- Huraa (Kaafu Atoll), Maldives
- Huraa dynasty, the former ruling dynasty of the Maldives

== See also ==
- Hura (disambiguation)
