= Hur, Iran =

Hur or Howr (Persian: حور) may refer to:

- Hur, Ardabil, a village in Ardabil Province, Iran
- Hur, Qaleh Ganj, a village in Kerman Province, Iran
- Hur, Ravar, a village in Kerman Province, Iran
- Hur Rural District, in Kerman Province, Iran
- Hur-e Olya, a village in Kerman Province, Iran
