= Margna =

Wooden staff carried by Mandaean priests

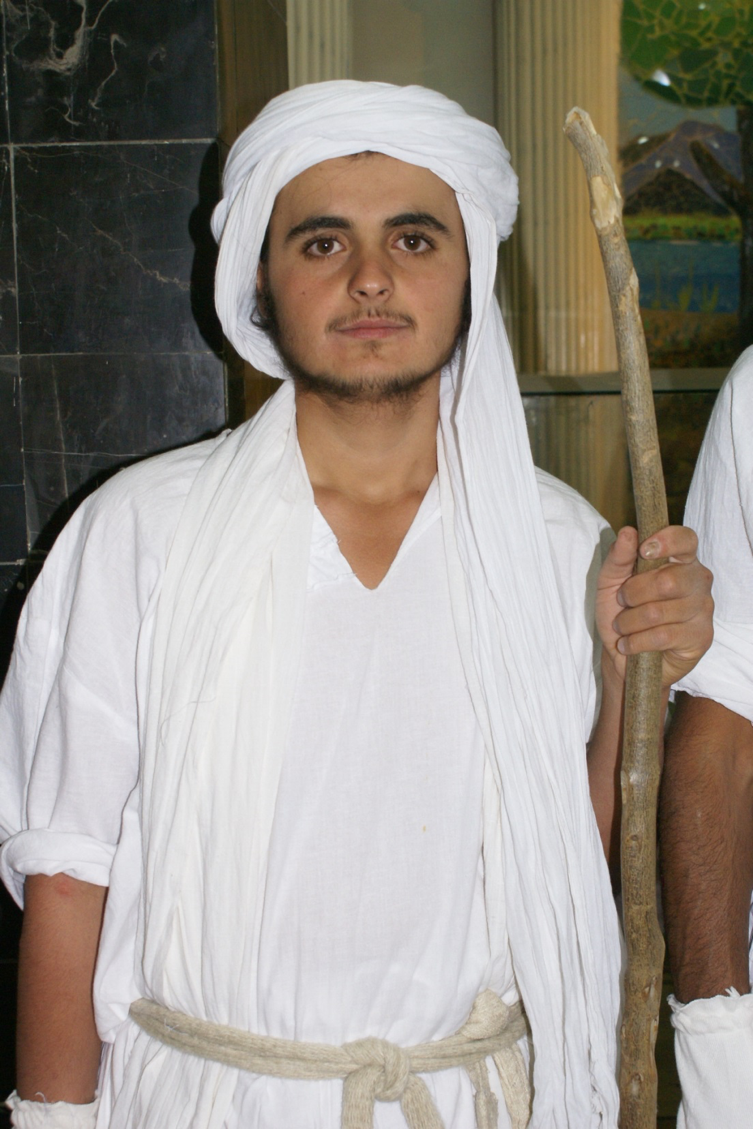
- A Mandaean novice or šualia ࡔࡅࡀࡋࡉࡀ holding a margna in Baghdad, Iraq in 2008
- Type: staff
- Material: wood (typically olive)
- Place of origin: southern Iraq and southwestern Iran

The margna (Classical Mandaic: ࡌࡀࡓࡂࡍࡀ, Modern Mandaic pronunciation: [ˈmɑrgənæ]) is a ritual olive wooden staff carried by Mandaean priests. A Mandaean priest always carries his margna during baptismal (masbuta) rituals.

According to the Right Ginza, the margna (staff) of Living Water (Mia Hayya) is one of the weapons of Manda d-Hayyi.

== Etymology ==
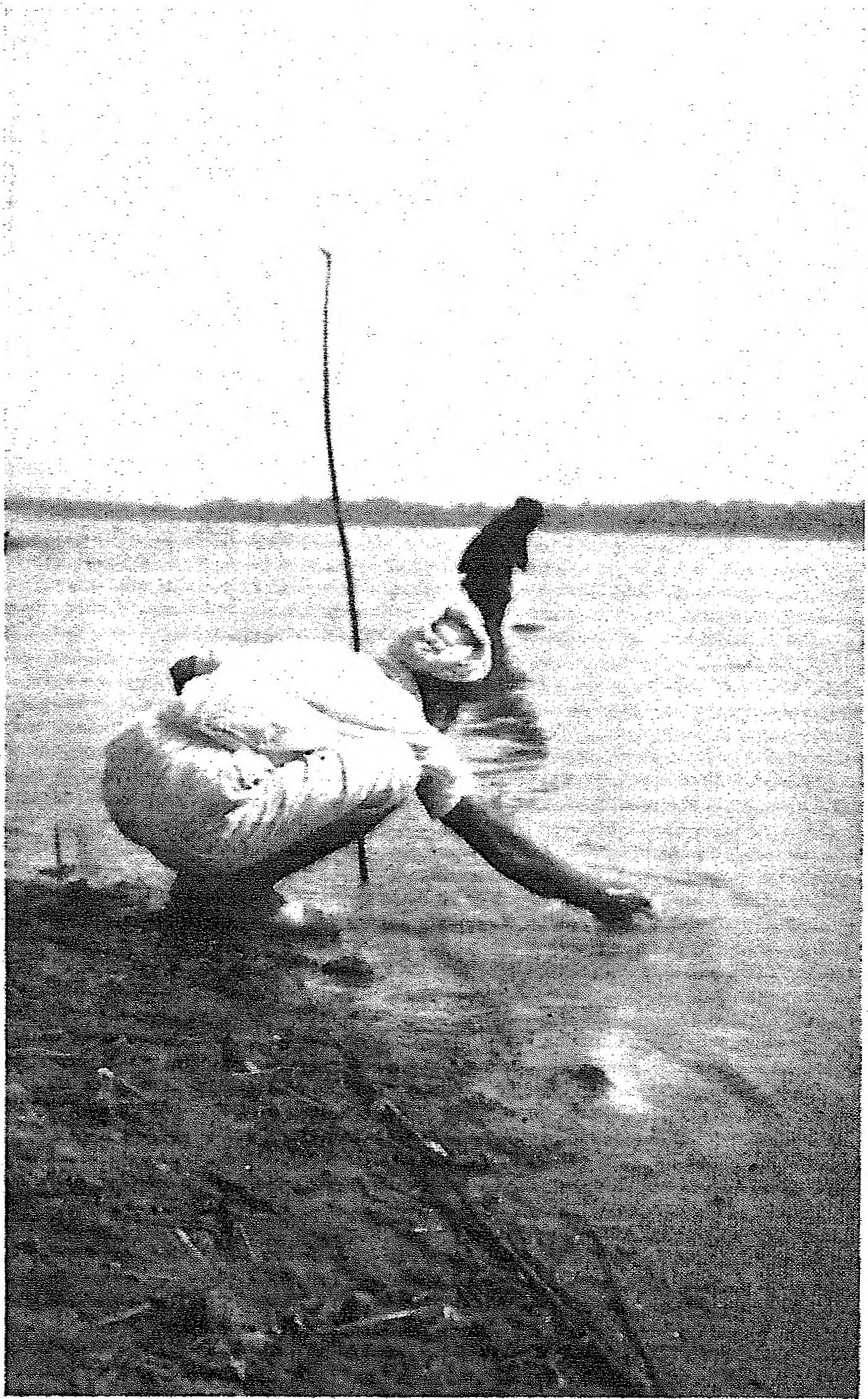
Performing ablution for the margna during the 1930s in southern Iraq

The Mandaic word margna is of Iranian origin.

== In the Qulasta ==
During priestly rituals, a klila (myrtle wreath) is placed on the margna. In the Qulasta, Prayer 79 is a prayer for the klila placed on the margna.

Prayer 14 in the Qulasta is dedicated to the margna. The prayer describes the margna as being covered in radiance (ziwa) and light (nhura).

== See also ==
- Aaron's rod – Staves carried by Moses's brother, Aaron, in the Torah
- Caduceus – Staff carried by Hermes in Greek mythology
- Mandaean priest § Clothing
- Rod of Asclepius – Symbol of medicine
- Sceptre – Staff held by a ruler to symbolize authority
- Staff of Moses – Walking stick used by Moses
- Staff of office – Stick denoting position, rank or prestige
- Was-sceptre – Ancient Egyptian religious symbol
