= Ben-Hur =

Ben-Hur or Ben Hur may refer to:

== Fiction ==
- Ben-Hur: A Tale of the Christ, an 1880 novel by American general and author Lew Wallace
  - Ben-Hur (play), a play that debuted on Broadway in 1899
  - Ben Hur (1907 film), a one-reel silent film adaptation produced by Kalem Studios of New York
  - Ben-Hur (1925 film), an MGM silent film adaptation starring Ramon Novarro
  - Ben-Hur (1959 film), an MGM sound film adaptation starring Charlton Heston; winner of eleven Academy Awards
  - Ben Hur (2003 film), an animated direct-to-video film adaptation featuring the voice of Charlton Heston
  - Ben Hur (miniseries), a television miniseries that aired in 2010
  - Ben-Hur (2016 film), directed by Timur Bekmambetov and starring Jack Huston
  - Judah Ben-Hur, the main character of the novel and adaptations

== People ==
- Ben-Hur Baz (1906–2003), a Mexican painter of pin-up art
- Ben-Hur (footballer) (born 1977), a Brazilian football midfielder
- Benhur Salimbangon (born 1945), a Filipino politician
- Ben Hur Villanueva (1938–2020), a Filipino sculptor
- Benhur Abalos (born 1962) a Filipino politician

== Places ==
- Ben Hur, Arkansas, an unincorporated community in Newton County, Arkansas
- Ben Hur, California, an unincorporated community in Mariposa County, California
- Ben Hur, Texas, an unincorporated community in Limestone County, Texas
- Ben-Hur, a settlement in the district capital of the Kalahari Constituency, Namibia
- Ben Hur, Virginia, an unincorporated community in Lee County, Virginia

== Other uses ==
- Ben Hur (album), an album by Bitch Magnet
- Ben-Hur Museum, renamed the General Lew Wallace Study and Museum
- Club Sportivo Ben Hur, a sports club in Argentina
- Ben Hur (automobile), an early car
- Ben Hur trailer, a nickname for the World War II G-518 one-ton U.S. Army trailer
- Tribe of Ben-Hur, an authorized fraternal order based on the book, later an insurance company
- Paradelta Ben Hur, an Italian paraglider design

== See also ==
- Ben Huh, South-Korean-American internet entrepreneur
- Hur (Bible)
