= Aaron's rod =

Staves carried by Moses's brother, Aaron, in the Torah

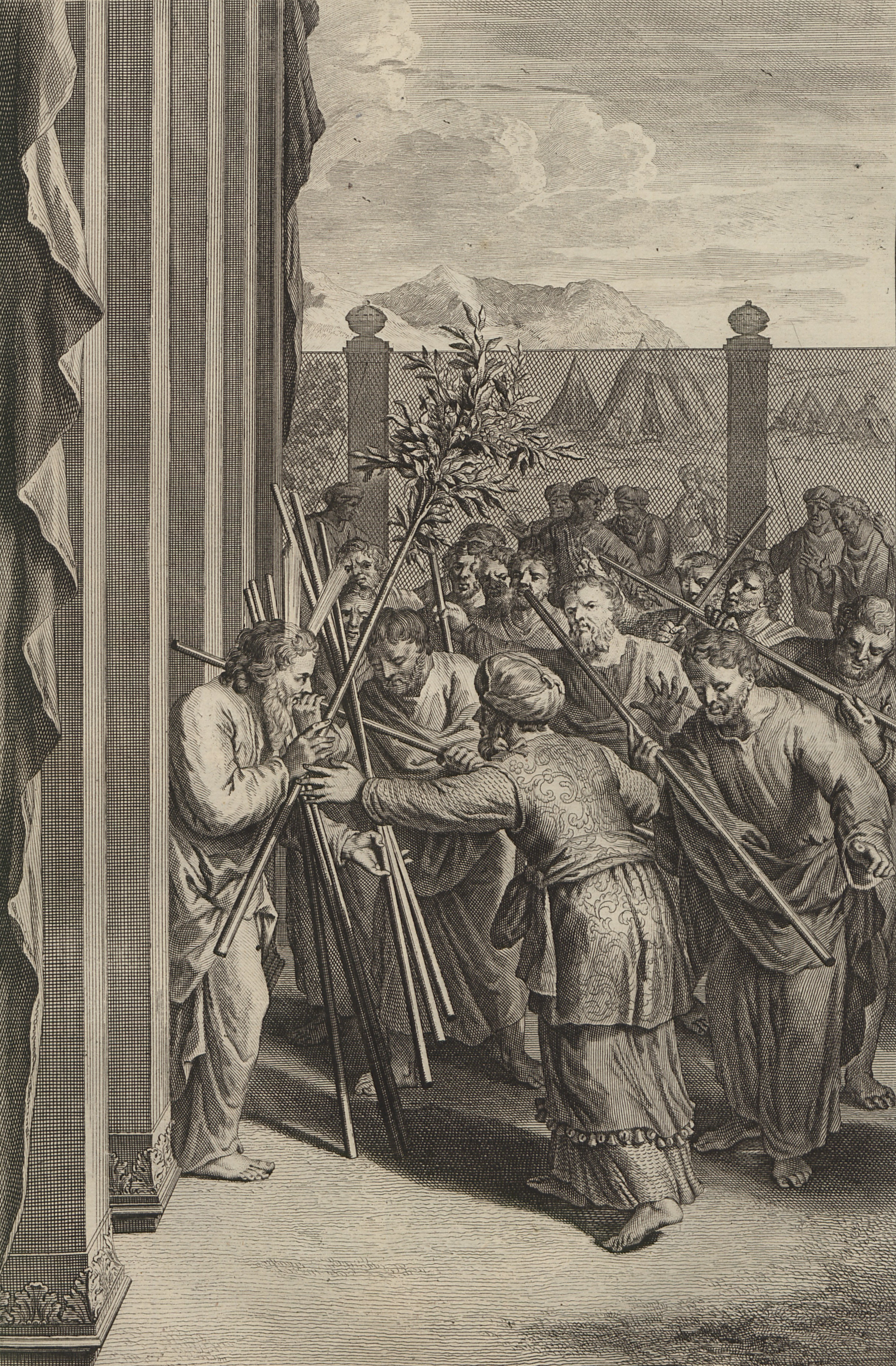
Aaron's rod budding

Aaron's rod (Hebrew: מַטֶּה אַהֲרֹן) refers to any of the walking sticks carried by Moses's brother, Aaron, in the Torah. The Bible tells how, along with Moses's rod, Aaron's rod was endowed with miraculous power during the Plagues of Egypt that preceded the Exodus. Later, his rod miraculously sprouted blossoms and almonds to symbolize God's choice of Aaron and his tribe for holy service.

The flowering staff of Aaron in the biblical narrative may be an etiology of the asherah cultic object. Aaron’s rod, originally associated with priestly and magical powers, may have been later transferred to Moses in various biblical accounts, demonstrating his authority and divine empowerment.

== Biblical references ==
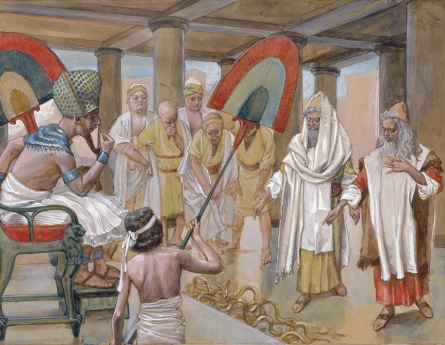
James Tissot, The Rod of Aaron Devours the Other Rods

In Israelite culture, the rod (Hebrew: מַטֶּה maṭṭeh) was a natural symbol of authority, as the tool used by the shepherd to correct and guide his flock. Moses, in fact, initially carried his rod while tending his sheep, and later it became his symbol of authority over the Israelites.

The rods of both Moses and Aaron were endowed with miraculous power during the Plagues of Egypt. God commanded Moses to raise his rod over the Red Sea when it was to be split and in prayer over Israel in battle; at Meribah Moses brought forth water from a stone using his rod.

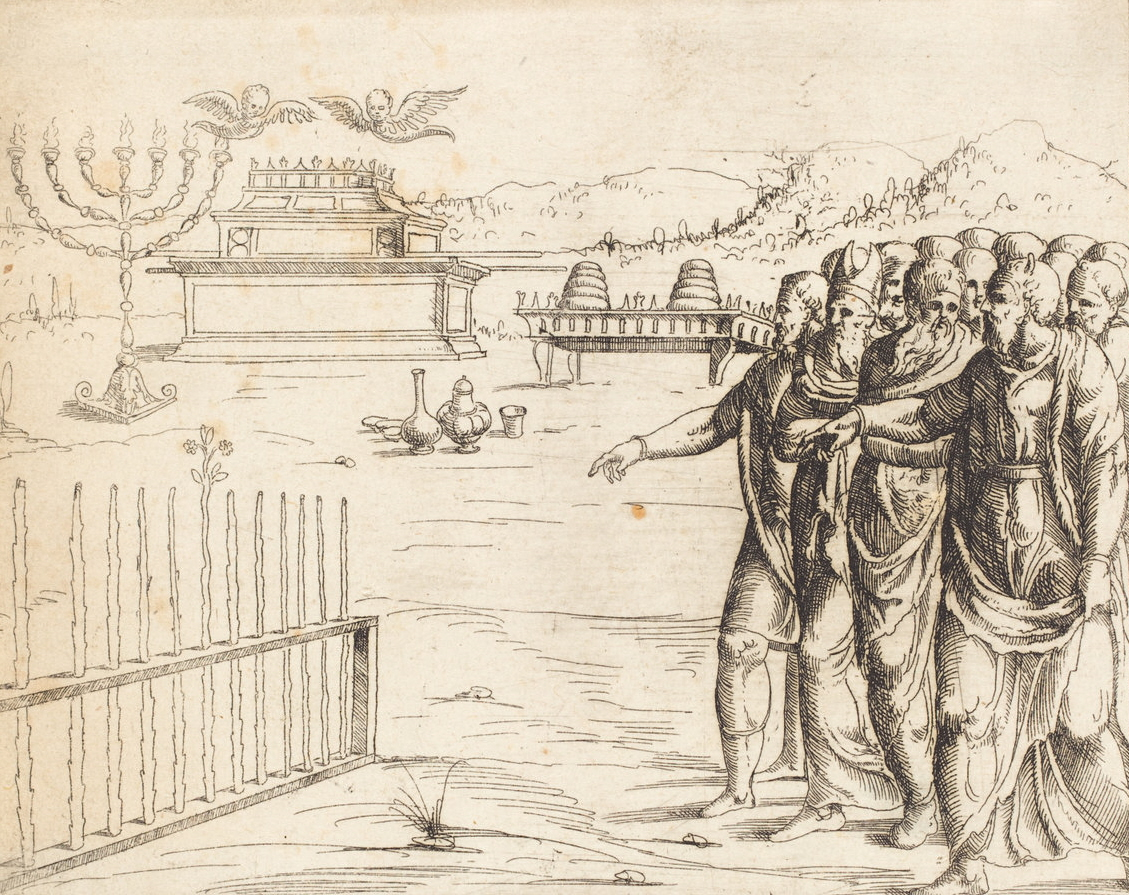
The Blossoming of Aaron's Rod, etching by Augustin Hirschvogel

Aaron's rod – perhaps a different rod – reappears in Numbers 16–17. Here Korah's rebellion against Moses's proclamation of the tribe of Levi as the priesthood has been quashed and the entire congregation's ensuing rebellion has resulted in a plague, ended only by the intercession of Moses and Aaron. In order to "stop the complaints" of the Israelites, God commands that each of the Twelve Tribes provide a rod; and only that of the tribe chosen to become priests will miraculously sprout overnight. Aaron provides his rod to represent the tribe of Levi, and "it put forth buds, produced blossoms, and bore ripe almonds", as an evidence of the exclusive right to the priesthood of the tribe of Levi. In commemoration of this decision, it was commanded that the rod be stored "before the testimony".

Aaron's rod is cited as exhibiting miraculous power on its own, when not physically held by its owner. In Exodus 7:10–1, Aaron "cast down his rod" and it became a serpent (as it happened with Moses's rod at Exodus 4:2–5). When he does so, the Pharaoh's sorcerers counter by similarly casting down their own rods, which also become serpents, but Aaron's rod swallowed them all. Similarly, in Numbers 17:23 it sprouted blossoms when not being held.

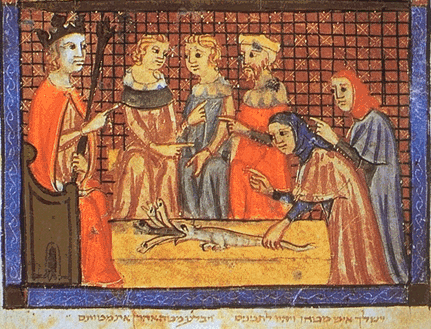
From the Sarajevo Haggadah

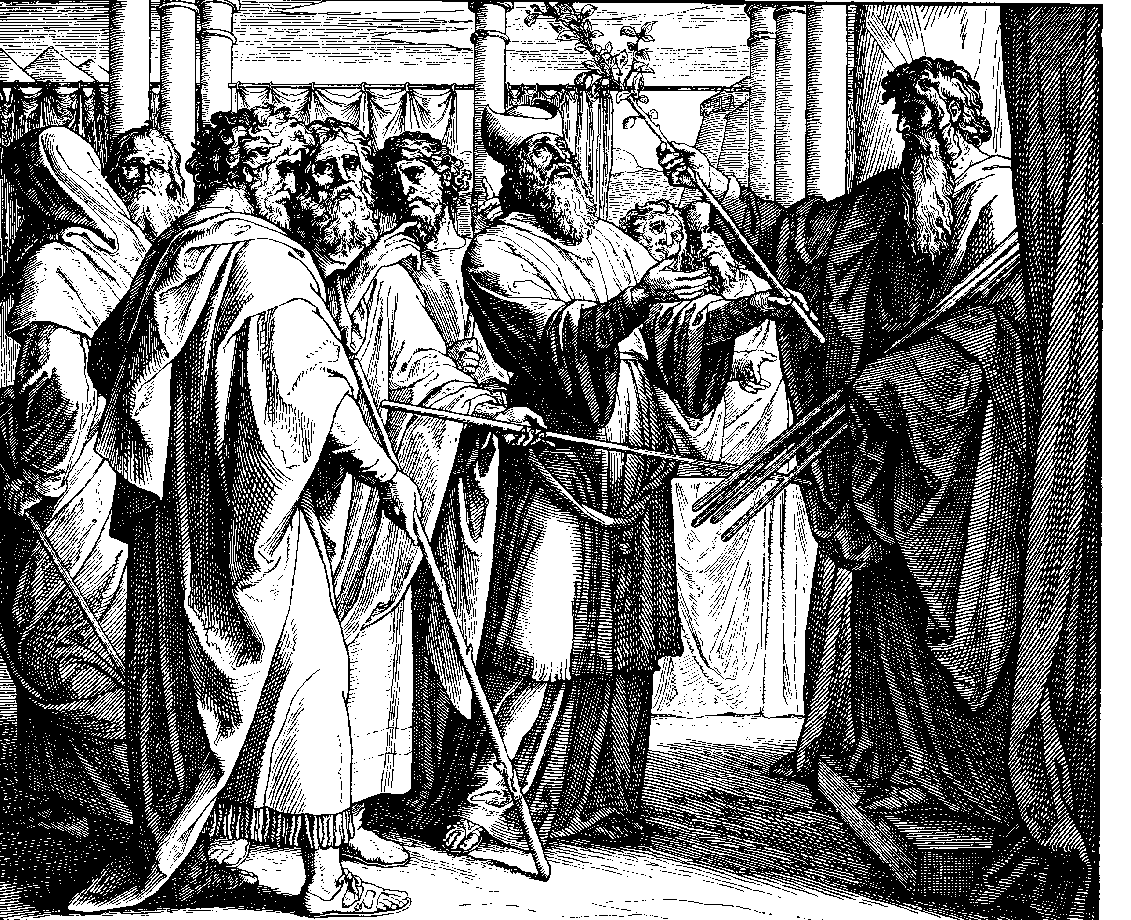
Aaron's Staff Buds, 1860 woodcut by Julius Schnorr von Karolsfeld

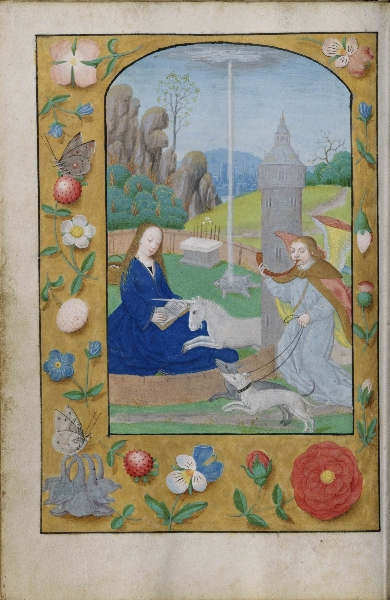
Hunt of the Unicorn Annunciation (c. 1500) from a Netherlandish book of hours. In the hortus conclusus, Gideon's fleece is worked in, and the altar at the rear has Aaron's rod that miraculously flowered in the centre. Both are types for the Annunciation.

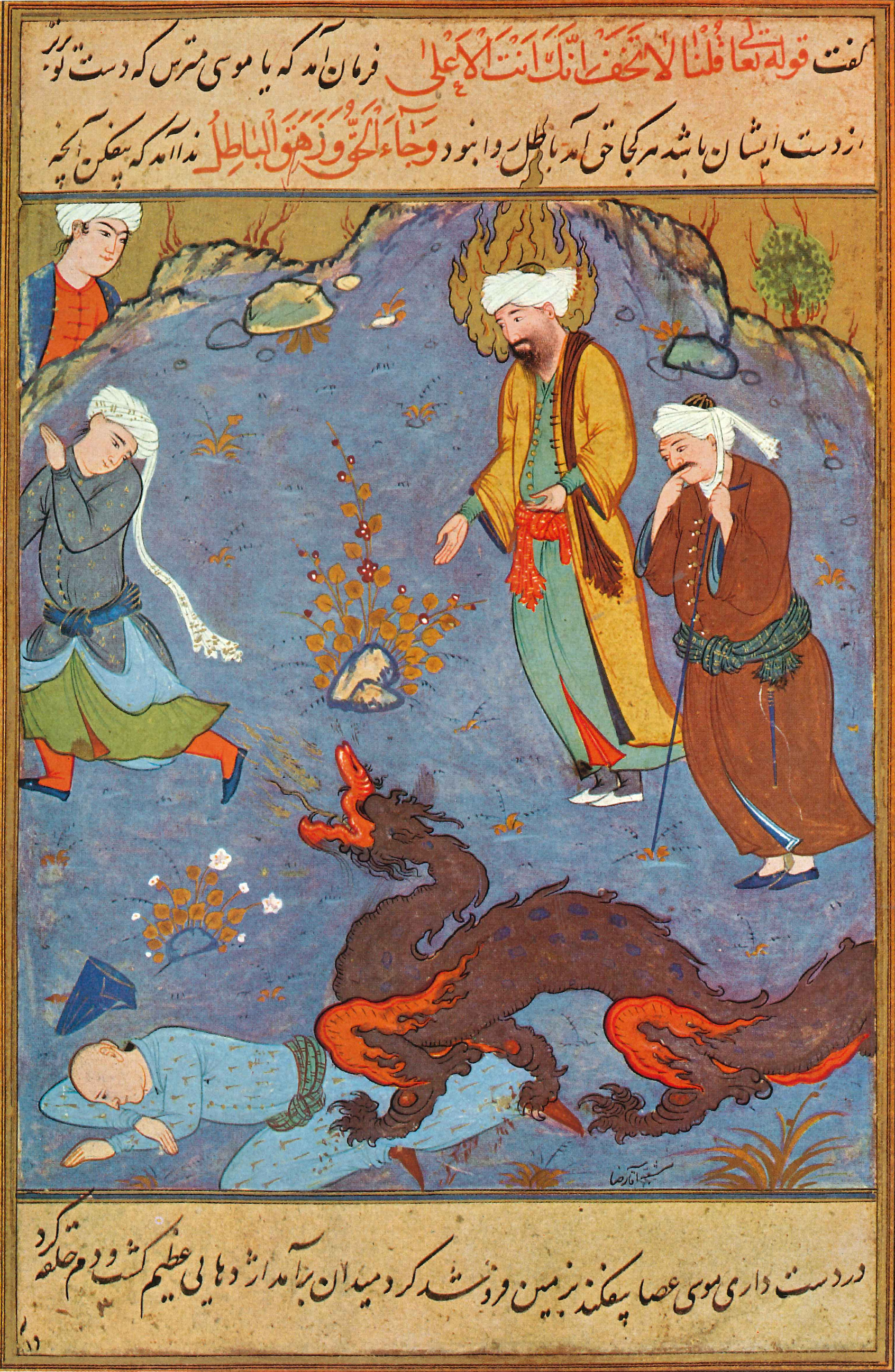
Moses and Aaron conjuring a Dragon which attacks the Magician Servants of the Pharaoh, al-Tha'labi's Stories of the Prophets in the Persian language

== In Rabbinical literature ==
Rabbinic midrash described attributes of Aaron's rod beyond those in the Biblical text.

It is reported that the rod was made of sapphire, weighed forty seahs (a seah = 10.70 pounds), and bore the inscription דצ״ך עד״ש באח״ב (the initials of the Hebrew names of the Ten Plagues).

God created it in the twilight of the sixth day of Creation, and delivered it to Adam when the latter was driven from paradise. After it had passed through the hands of Shem, Enoch, Abraham, Isaac, and Jacob successively, it came into the possession of Joseph. On Joseph's death the Egyptian nobles stole some of his belongings, and, among them, Jethro appropriated the staff. Jethro planted the staff in his garden, when its marvelous virtue was revealed by the fact that nobody could withdraw it from the ground (compare "the sword in the stone"); even to touch it was fraught with danger to life. This was because the Ineffable Name of God was engraved upon it. When Moses entered Jethro's household he read the Name, and by means of it was able to draw up the rod, for which service Zipporah, Jethro's daughter, was given to him in marriage. Her father had sworn that she should become the wife of the man who should be able to master the miraculous rod and of no other.

Aaron's rod, together with its blossoms and fruit, was preserved in the Ark. King Josiah, who foresaw the impending national catastrophe, concealed the Ark and the objects stored with it (Aaron's rod, a vial of manna, and the holy anointing oil). Their whereabouts will remain unknown until, in the Messianic age, the prophet Elijah shall reveal them.

The Bible ascribes similar miraculous powers to rods of Aaron and Moses. One midrash goes a step further, and identifies them as being the same rod:

The rod with which Jacob crossed the Jordan (Genesis 32:11) is the same rod which was in Judah's hand (Genesis 38:18), which was in Moses's hand (Exodus 4:20), which was in Aaron's hand (Exodus 7:10), which was in David's hand (1 Samuel 17:40). which was in the hand of each king until the destruction of the Temple, when it was hidden. When the Messiah comes it will be given to him for a scepter in token of his authority over the nations.

According to one midrash, Moses split a tree trunk into twelve portions, and gave one portion to each tribe. When the Rod of Aaron produced blossoms, the Israelites could not but acknowledge the significance of the token. This opinion seemingly assumes that the rod in Korach's rebellion was separate from the rod used for the plagues.

== Christian use ==
Hebrews 9:4 states that Aaron's rod was kept in the Ark of the Covenant.

The account of the blossoming of Aaron's rod contained in Clement's first letter to the Corinthians (ep. 43) is in haggadic-midrashic style, and may probably be ascribed to Jewish or, more strictly speaking, Jewish-Hellenistic sources. According to that account, Moses placed upon each of the twelve staffs the corresponding seal of the head of a tribe. The doors of the sanctuary were similarly sealed, to prevent anyone from having access to the rods at night.

The miraculous flowering of the rod was also considered a type of the Incarnation of Christ and his Virgin Birth, and appears in scenes of the Annunciation to Mary.

In the Ethiopian fourteenth-century text of the Kebra Nagast, Aaron's rod is broken in three and probably a symbol of the Trinity: "The rod of Aaron which sprouted after it had become withered though no one watered it with water, and one had broken it in two places, and it became three rods being [originally only] one rod."

== Islamic literature ==
Accounts of Aaron's rod appear in Islamic literature. A depiction from al-Tha'labi's (d. 1035, AH 427) Stories of the Prophets depicts Harun (Aaron) leaning on his rod, while his brother Musa's (Moses) staff miraculously turned into a snake-dragon to defeat Pharaoh's magicians.

== As an Architectural Term ==
Since the 1823 printing of Peter Nicholson's The New Practical Building and Workman's Companion the term Aaron's Rod has frequently appeared at the start of architectural dictionaries as a type of ornament found in buildings. However, this term was misunderstood by Nicholson's reading of the earlier Thirty-Three Designs (1765) by George Jameson and is not actually a common architectural motif.

== In modern literature ==
D. H. Lawrence's 1922 novel Aaron's Rod describes a flautist, Aaron Sissons, and his experiences as he journeys through a Europe exhausted by the First World War. The biblical eponymous reference, with the flute representing a magic rod, is intended to be ironic.

== See also ==
- Caduceus – Staff carried by Hermes in Greek mythology, symbol of commerce
- Korach – Portion of the annual Jewish cycle of Torah reading (in which Aaron's rod blooms)
- Margna – Wooden staff carried by Mandaean priests
- Nehushtan – Brass serpent in Torah
- Ningizzida – Mesopotamian god
- Rod of Asclepius – Symbol of medicine
