= Hur, Ravar =

Hur حور
- Village
- Location within Iran
- Coordinates: 30°50′07″N 57°03′38″E
- Country: Iran
- Province: Kerman
- County: Ravar
- Bakhsh: Kuhsaran
- Rural District: Heruz

Population (2006)
  - Total: 273
- Time zone: UTC+3:30 (IRST)
  - Summer (DST): UTC+4:30 (IRDT)

Hur (Persian: حور, also Romanized as Ḩūr and Howr; also known as Haur) is a village in Heruz Rural District, Kuhsaran District, Ravar County, Kerman Province, Iran. At the 2006 census, its population was 273, in 73 families.
