= Hura (disambiguation) =

Hura is a Bedouin village in the Southern District of Israel.

Hura may also refer to:

- Hura (plant), a genus of trees
- Hura, Purulia, a village in West Bengal, India
  - Hura (community development block)
  - Hura (Vidhan Sabha constituency)
- Maata "Te Reo" Hura (1904–1991), president of the Ratana Church of New Zealand
- Sohrab Hura (born 1981), Indian photographer

== See also ==
- Huraa (disambiguation)
- Hurra (disambiguation)
- Ahura
- Sura (disambiguation)
