= Al-Ahrar subdistrict =

Al-Ahrar subdistrict ناحية الأحرار
- Al-Ahrar's location in Iraq
- Coordinates: 32.3393721°N 45.5051995°E
- Country: Iraq
- Governorate: Wasit
- district: An Numaniyah

Area
  - Total: 480 sq mi (1,244 km^{2})

Population
  - Total: 63.000

Al-Ahrar (Arabic: ناحية الأحرار) is a subdistrict of the An Numaniyah district in the Wasit Governorate of Iraq, on the west bank of the Tigris. Its seat is the town of the Ahrar. The subdistrict was established in 1961, and covers 1244 square km. Farming is the main occupation in Al-Ahrar subdistrict due to irrigated alluvial soil. It is famous for production of wheat, rice and date palm.

== Ahdab oil field ==
Ahdab oil field lies in a 303 square km area in Al-Ahrar subdistrict. Iraqi's official sources estimated the oilfield's reserves at 1 billion barrel. A contract to develop Ahdab oil field was signed between Saddam Hussein's regime and CNPC in 1996, but the deal was delayed after the United Nations imposed sanctions on Iraq and postponed further by the Iraq War. The work commenced in 2008 and the production began in 2011 with 60,000 barrels per day, increasing to 140,000 barrel the next year.

Ahdab oilfield is a joint project of CNPC (75%) and South Oil Company (25%).

== Ubaydah Bin Al Jarrah Air Base ==
Ubaydah Bin Al Jarrah Air Base is a main Iraqi airbase located in the southern part of the Al-Ahrar subdistrict, built by Yugoslavian companies during the 1980s. The air base played a key role during the Iran–Iraq War for its location near the border with Iran. The airbase consists of runway, taxiways, and 200 hardened aircraft shelters accommodate 3 squadrons of Su-20/22s and a squadron of MiG-21s and MiG-23s for air defence.
