= Al-Hurriya (magazine) =

al-Ḥurrīya
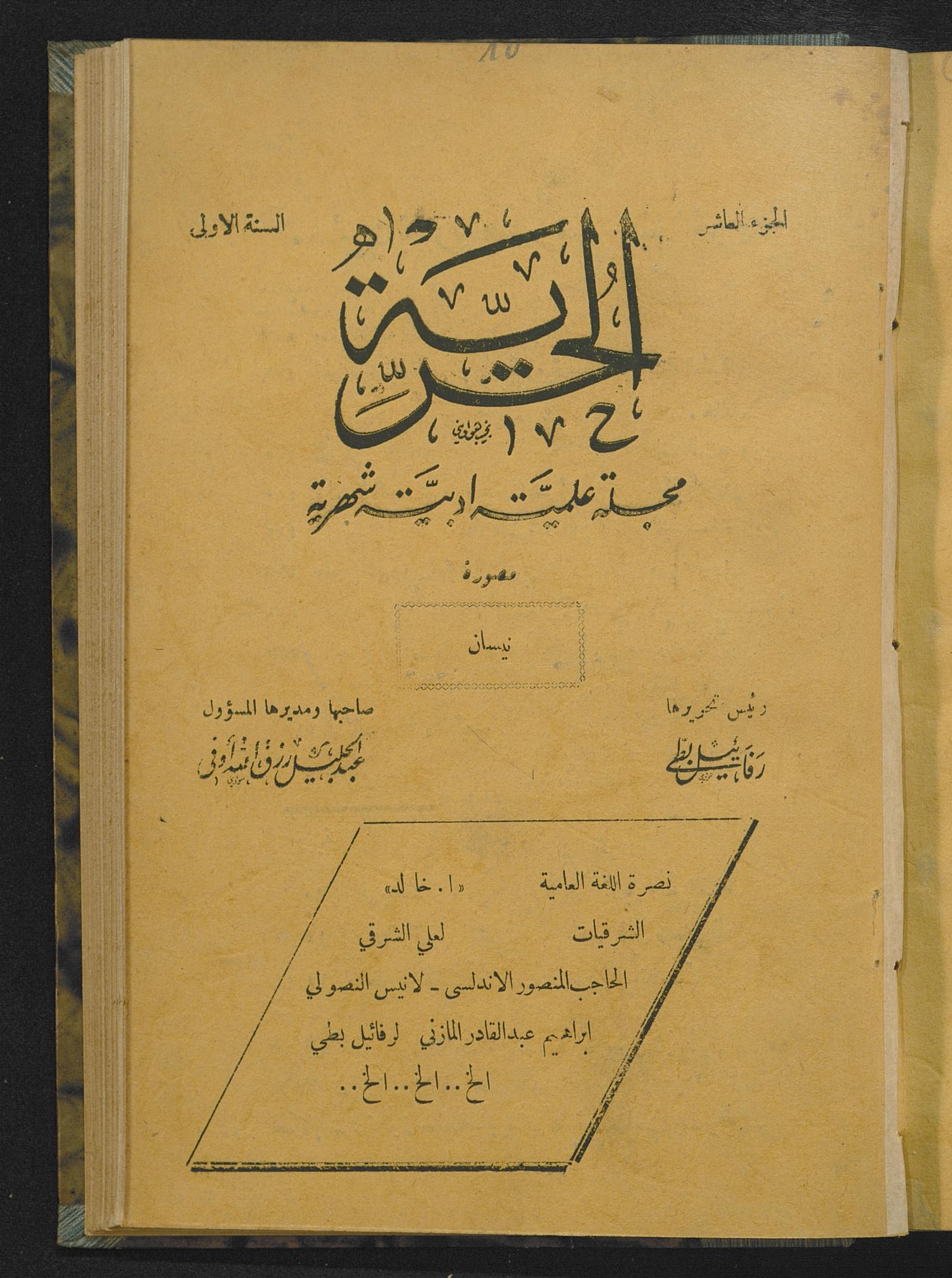
- Editor: Rafa'il Butti
- Categories: Literature, Politics
- Founded: 1924
- Final issue: 1925
- Country: Iraq
- Based in: Baghdad
- Language: Arabic

The Arabic-language journal al-Ḥurrīya (Arabic: الحرىة; DMG: al-Ḥurrīya; English: "Freedom") was published in Baghdad in 1924 and 1925. The Christian Rafa'il Butti (1901-1956), an Iraqi intellectual and well-known journalist, edited one volume with a total of ten issues. The content focused on political and literary topics of the Arab world at that time.

In 1930 Butti published another magazine, al-Bilad. This supported the party of the National Brotherhood, which formed the opposition to the British influence. It was the first daily newspaper of that time and became one of the leading press mediums in Iraq. Butti's support of the opposition with the help of his publications resulted in the magazine's closure.
