= An Numaniyah =

An-Nu'maniyah النعمانية
- City
- Location Iraq
- Coordinates: 32°30′0″N 45°20′0″E
- Country: Iraq
- Governorate: Wasit
- District: Al-Nu'maniya District

Population (2018)
  - Total: 71,000

An-Nu'mānīyah (Arabic: النعمانية, romanized: an-Nuʿmānīyah) is a city on the Tigris river in Iraq, located roughly 140 kilometres (87 mi) southeast of Baghdad in the Wasit Province. It is the site of one of four national training centers for the Iraqi Army.

It is also the site of a base that was built by the Saddam Hussein regime and constructed by Yugoslavian contractors Mostogradnja. Following the beginning of the Iraq War, it changed its purpose September 1, 2004 to operate as a training base for new recruits and serve as the home station for three battalions of the Iraqi Intervention Force – the Iraqi army's counterinsurgency wing.

== History ==
An-Nu'maniyah is named after al-Nu'man III ibn al-Mundhir who ruled the region. The city hosts the tomb of Al-Mutanabbi.

Nu'maniyah was an important town during the Middle Ages. It lay on the western bank of the Tigris, across from the town of Jabbul, and was the capital of the Upper Zab district. It had a Friday mosque in its marketplace. Ibn Rustah commented that Nu'maniyah was renowned for its carpets, which resembled those made at al-Hirah. In the 1300s, Hamdallah Mustawfi described Nu'maniyah as a prosperous town surrounded by date palm groves. Near the town, there was a monastery called Dayr Hizqil, where the monks looked after the mentally ill.

== An-Numaniyah Airfield ==
Located in An Numaniyah was the An Numaniyah Air Base and Training Center, which garrisoned 3 battalions of the Iraq Intervention Force. The base closed in 2006 after suffering corruption.

== Sources ==
- Le Strange, Guy (1905). The Lands of the Eastern Caliphate: Mesopotamia, Persia, and Central Asia, from the Moslem Conquest to the Time of Timur. Cambridge: Cambridge University Press. OCLC 458169031.
