= Al-Hurra, Syria =

Al-Hurra الحرة
- Village
- Location in Syria
- Coordinates: 35°25′2″N 36°19′52″E
- Country: Syria
- Governorate: Hama
- District: Suqaylabiyah
- Subdistrict: Suqaylabiyah

Population (2004)
  - Total: 843
- Time zone: UTC+3 (AST)
- City Qrya Pcode: N/A

Al-Hurra (Arabic: الحرة) is a village in northern Syria located in the Suqaylabiyah Subdistrict of the al-Suqaylabiyah District in Hama Governorate. According to the Syria Central Bureau of Statistics (CBS), al-Hurra had a population of 843 in the 2004 census. Its inhabitants are predominantly Alawites.
