= Ben Hur (automobile) =

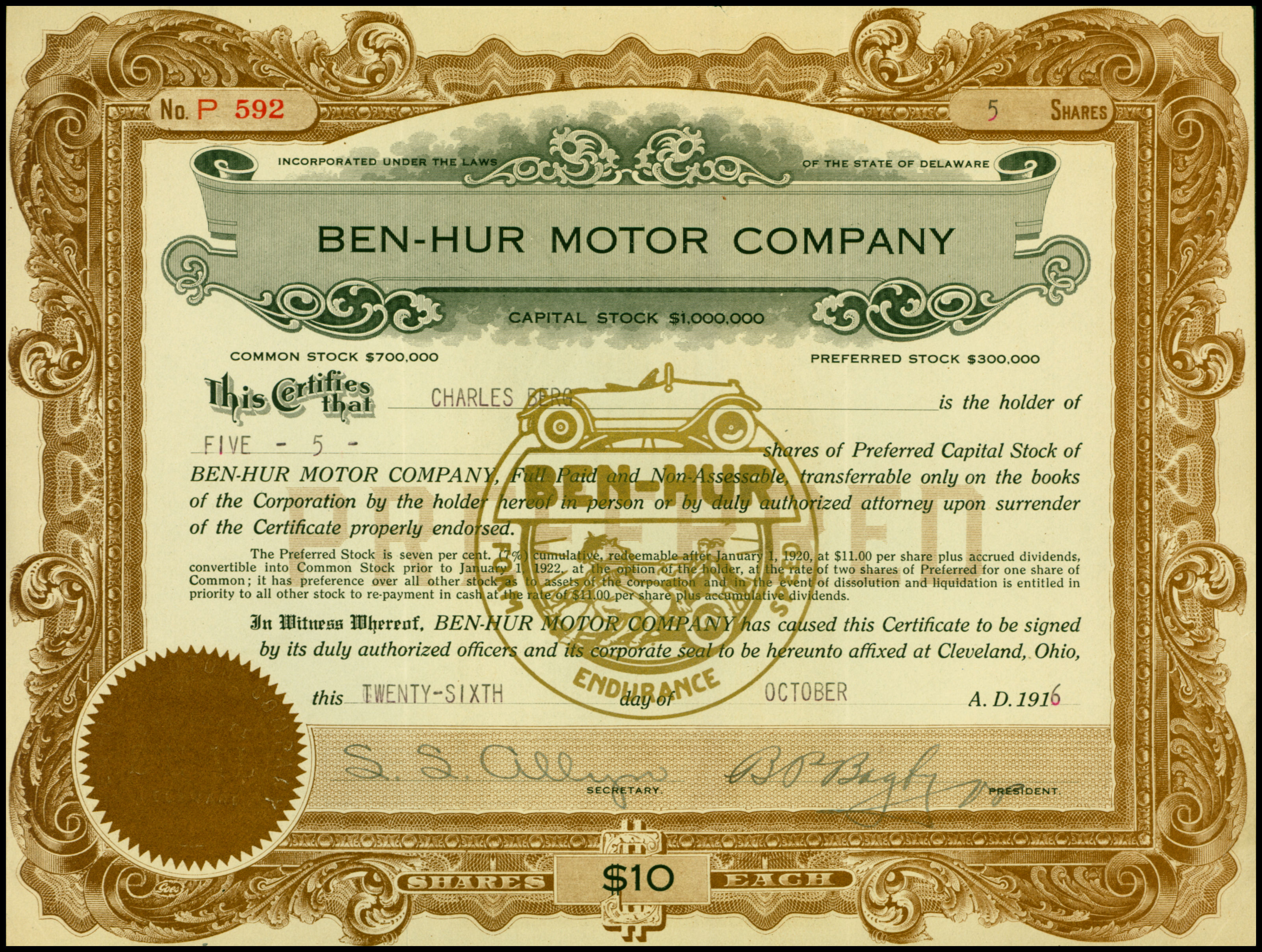
Share of the Ben-Hur Motor Company, issued 26. October 1916

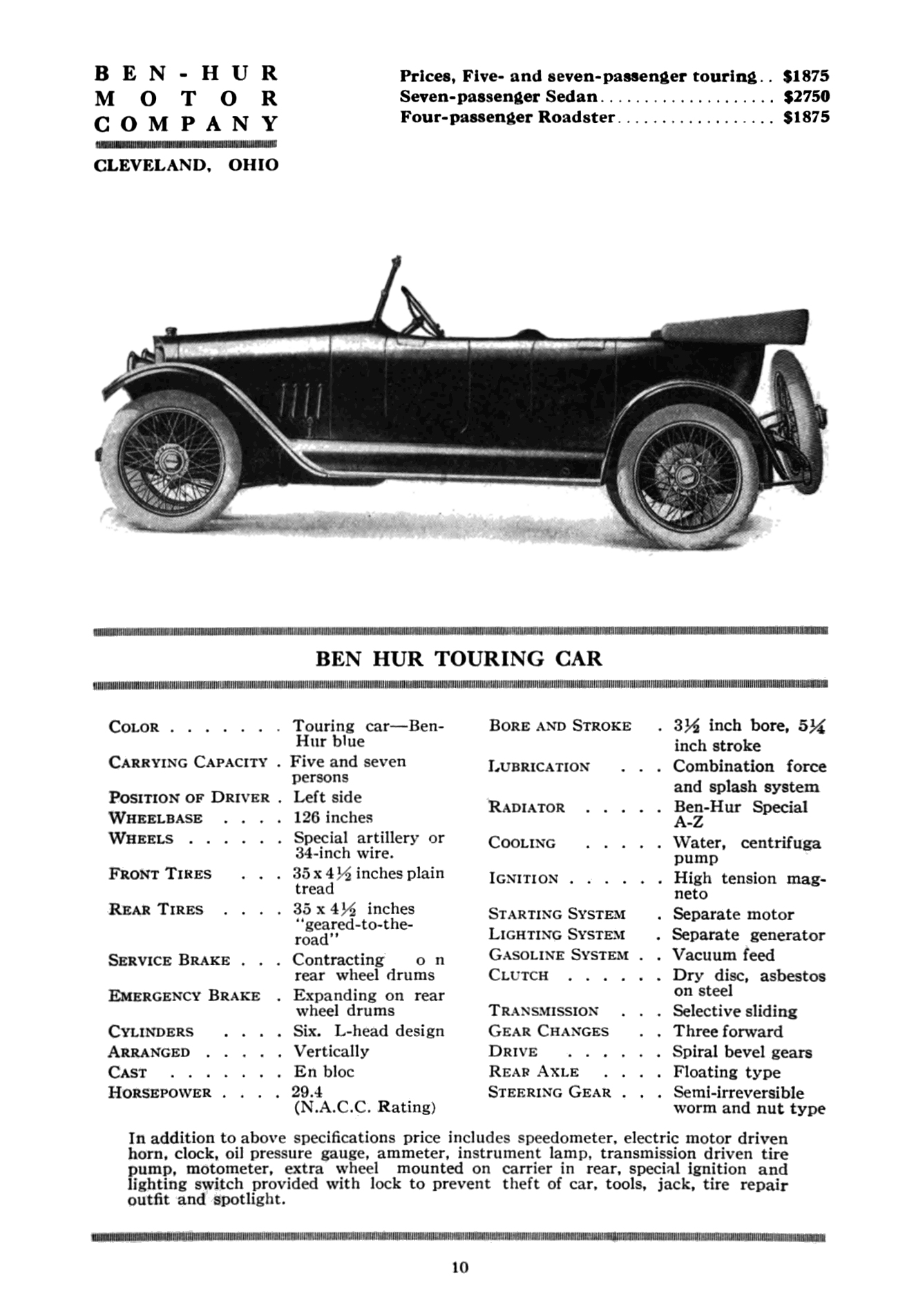
The Ben Hur Touring Car from McClure's Automobile Yearbook 1917–18.

The Ben-Hur Motor Company was incorporated in 1916 in the state of Delaware, with the cars being built by L. L. Allyn in Willoughby, Ohio.

== Features ==
- Chassis with a wheelbase of 126 inches
- Buda six cylinder engine with splash and forced feed oiling system
- Bosch high-tension ignition magneto
- Westinghouse separate motor for starting
- Disc clutch and selective sliding gear set with three speeds forward and reverse
- 19 gallon gasoline tank is mounted on rear with a two-gallon reserve tank
- Timken axles are used in front and rear with wire wheels on which 35x4 tires are mounted.

== Prices ==
- Five and seven-passenger touring - $1875 (equivalent to $47,119 in 2025)
- Seven-passenger Sedan - $2750 (equivalent to $69,107 in 2025)
- Four-passenger Roadster - $1875

Ben-Hur exhibited a cloverleaf roadster at the 1917 New York Auto Show. In February 1918 Allyn announced that between 30 and 40 cars had been shipped to dealers, and that plans called for five to ten cars a week for the time being, owing to the difficulty in securing bodies. The company had a factory with a capacity of building 20 cars per day. A meeting was scheduled in March to increase capitalisation, but by May 1918 the company was in receivership.
