= Al-Houriya =

Weekly Mauritinian newspaper

Al-Houriya (Arabic: الحرية, meaning Freedom) is a weekly Arabic language newspaper in Mauritania. The director of the newspaper is Mohamed Nema Oumar.

== Arrests ==
On 12 June 2008, Mohamed Nema Oumar, managing editor of Al-Houriya, was arrested by the Mauritanian police after he published an article on Senator El Had and his activities in Israel. Oumar was arrested at the airport on his way back from Libya where he accompanied the Mauritanian President with an accredited press badge. Mohamed Nema Oumar was detained for 30 hours, and charged two days later with libel and insults. His passport was retained for 2 months. He is jailed again starting 21 July.

In July 2008, Mohammed Ould Abdel Latif, editor of Al-Houriya, was also arrested and detained by the Mauritanian police the day he published an article about corruption and briberies collected by high court judges. His article stipulated that these judges had received 68,650 euros to release a businessman and a policeman accused of drug trafficking.

On 6 August 2008, the International Federation of Journalists (IFJ) called for the release of the two journalists.
