= Houry =

- Commune
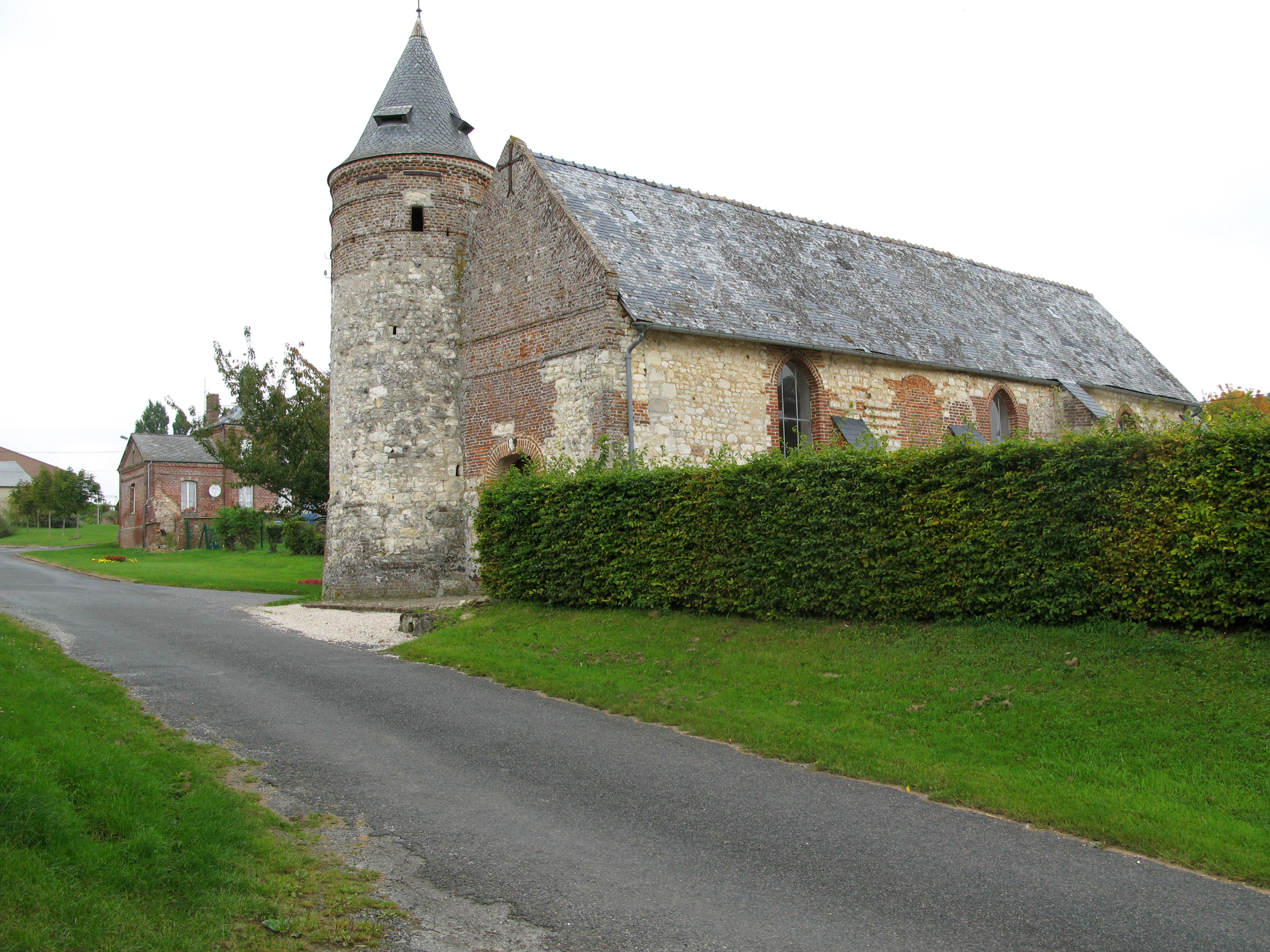
- The church of Houry
- Location of Houry
- Location within France Location within Hauts-de-France
- Coordinates: 49°47′00″N 3°51′02″E
- Country: France
- Region: Hauts-de-France
- Department: Aisne
- Arrondissement: Vervins
- Canton: Vervins
- Intercommunality: Thiérache du Centre

Government
  - Mayor (2026–32): Antoine Soude
- Area^{1}: 3.48 km^{2} (1.34 sq mi)
- Elevation: 115 m (377 ft)
- Highest elevation: 172 m (564 ft)
- Lowest elevation: 90 m (300 ft)
- Population (2023): 57
  - Density: 16/km^{2} (42/sq mi)
- Time zone: UTC+01:00 (CET)
  - Summer (DST): UTC+02:00 (CEST)
- INSEE/Postal code: 02384 /02140
- ^{1} French Land Register data, which excludes lakes, ponds, glaciers > 1 km^{2} (0.386 sq mi or 247 acres) and river estuaries.

Houry (French pronunciation: [uʁi]) is a commune in the Aisne department in Hauts-de-France in northern France.

== Population ==
Historical population
Year	Pop.	±% p.a.
1968	69	—
1975	53	−3.70%
1982	49	−1.11%
1990	57	+1.91%
1999	57	+0.00%
2007	63	+1.26%
2012	54	−3.04%
2017	53	−0.37%
2023	57	+1.22%
Source: INSEE

== See also ==
- Communes of the Aisne department
