= Hurriya =

Hurriya or Hurriyya (Arabic, 'freedom') may refer to:

== Places ==
- Al-Hurriya, Baghdad, a neighborhood in Iraq's capital
- Hurriya, a district of Idlib, Syria
- Al Hurriya Air Base, a military airbase in Iraq
- Camp Hurriya, or Camp Liberty, a former U.S. military installation in Baghdad, Iraq
- Huriyah al Jadidah, a village in Iraq

== Sports ==
- Hurriyya SC, a Maldivian sports club and football team
- El Horreya SC, an Egyptian football club
- Al-Hurriya SC, a Syrian sports club
- Al-Hurriya SC (Iraq), a Baghdad football team

== Media ==
- Al-Hurriya (newspaper), a Palestinian political newspaper
- Al-Hurriya (magazine), published in Baghdad in 1924 and 1925

== See also ==
- All Parties Hurriyat Conference, a separatist political alliance in Jammu and Kashmir, India
