= Hassan Houri =

Iranian footballer

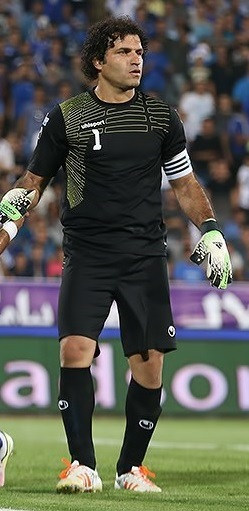

Personal information
- Date of birth: 11 February 1985 (age 41)
- Place of birth: Andimeshk, Iran
- Height: 1.84 m (6 ft 1/2 in)
- Position: Goalkeeper

Youth career
- Foolad

Senior career*
| Years | Team | Apps | (Gls) |
| 2003–2007 | Foolad | 45 | (0) |
| 2007–2008 | Sanat Naft | 31 | (0) |
| 2008–2009 | Mes Kerman | 2 | (0) |
| 2009–2011 | Sanat Naft | 55 | (0) |
| 2011–2012 | Mes Sarcheshmeh | 21 | (0) |
| 2012–2013 | Shahin Bushehr | 8 | (0) |
| 2013–2014 | Shahrdari Yasuj | 16 | (0) |
| 2014–2017 | Sanat Naft | 3 | (0) |

International career
| 2001 | Iran U17 | 3 | (0) |

Managerial career
- 2018–2020: Foolad Khuzestan B
- 2021–2024: Foolad Khuzestan B
- * Club domestic league appearances and goals

Hassan Houri (Persian: حسن هوری; born 11 February 1985) is an Iranian football manager and a former player.

== Club career ==
In 2009, Houri joined Sanat Naft Abadan F.C. after spending the previous season at Mes Kerman. He became Sanat Naft capitan in 2015.

| Club performance | | | League | | Cup | | Continental | | Total | |
| Season | Club | League | Apps | Goals | Apps | Goals | Apps | Goals | Apps | Goals |
| Iran | | | League | | Hazfi Cup | | Asia | | Total | |
|---|---|---|---|---|---|---|---|---|---|---|
| 2003–04 | Foolad | Pro League | 5 | 0 | | 0 | - | - | | 0 |
| 2004–05 | Foolad | Pro League | 8 | 0 | | 0 | - | - | | 0 |
| 2005–06 | Foolad | Pro League | 14 | 0 | | 0 | | | | 0 |
| 2006–07 | Foolad | Pro League | 18 | 0 | 2 | 0 | - | - | 20 | 0 |
| 2007–08 | Sanat Naft Abadan F.C. | Pro League | 31 | 0 | | 0 | - | - | | 0 |
| 2008–09 | Mes | Pro League | 2 | 0 | | 0 | - | - | | 0 |
| 2009–10 | Sanat Naft Abadan F.C. | Division 1 | 22 | 0 | | 0 | - | - | | 0 |
| 2010–11 | Sanat Naft Abadan F.C. | Pro League | 33 | 0 | 0 | 0 | - | - | 33 | 0 |
| 2011–12 | Mes Sarcheshmeh | Pro League | 20 | 0 | 0 | 0 | - | - | 20 | 0 |
| Career total | | | 151 | 0 | | 0 | | 0 | | 0 |
