= Hur (Bible) =

Biblical character; companion of Moses and Aaron (Exod. 17:10–12)

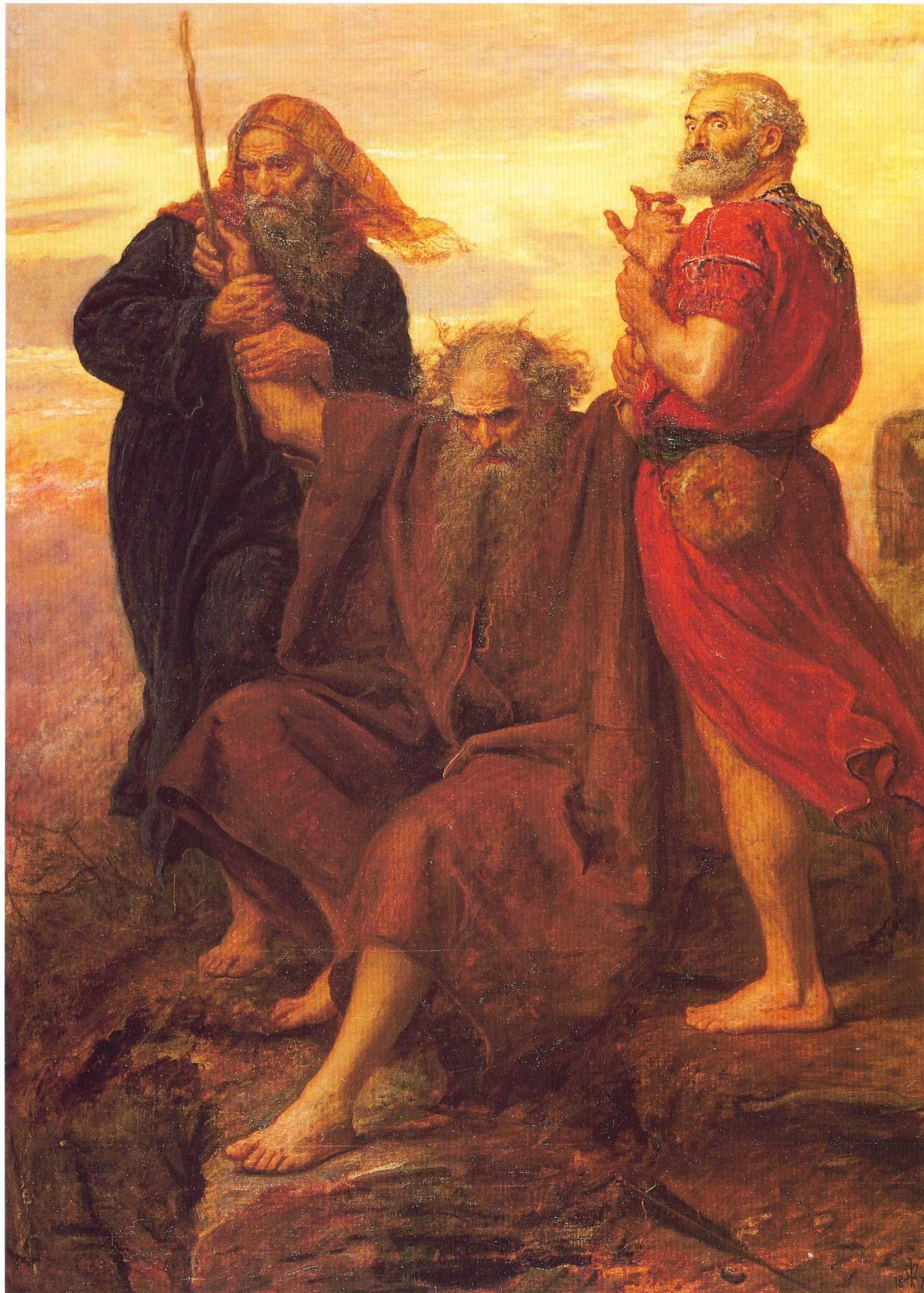
John Everett Millais' Victory O Lord! (1871) depicts Moses holding up his arms during the Battle of Rephidim, assisted by Hur (left) and Aaron.

Hur (Hebrew: חוּר, romanized: Ḥūr, also Chur) was a companion of Moses and Aaron in the Hebrew Bible. He was a member of the Tribe of Judah. His identity remains unclear in the Torah itself, but it is elaborated in rabbinical commentary.

Other individuals named Hur are also mentioned in the Bible.

== Hur, companion of Moses ==
In the Book of Exodus, Hur is first mentioned as a companion of Moses and Aaron watching the Battle of Rephidim against the Amalekites. He aided Aaron to hold up the hands of Moses when Moses realised that the Israelites prevailed in battle while his hands were raised: "Aaron and Hur stayed up his hands, the one on the one side, and the other on the other side". He is mentioned once more as Moses' staunch ally when he is left in co-charge with Aaron of the Israelites when Moses was away on Mount Sinai. Moses told the people "Aaron and Hur are with you; whosoever hath a cause, let him come near unto them." However, only Aaron is mentioned in the later account of events during Moses' absence and the creation of the Golden Calf.

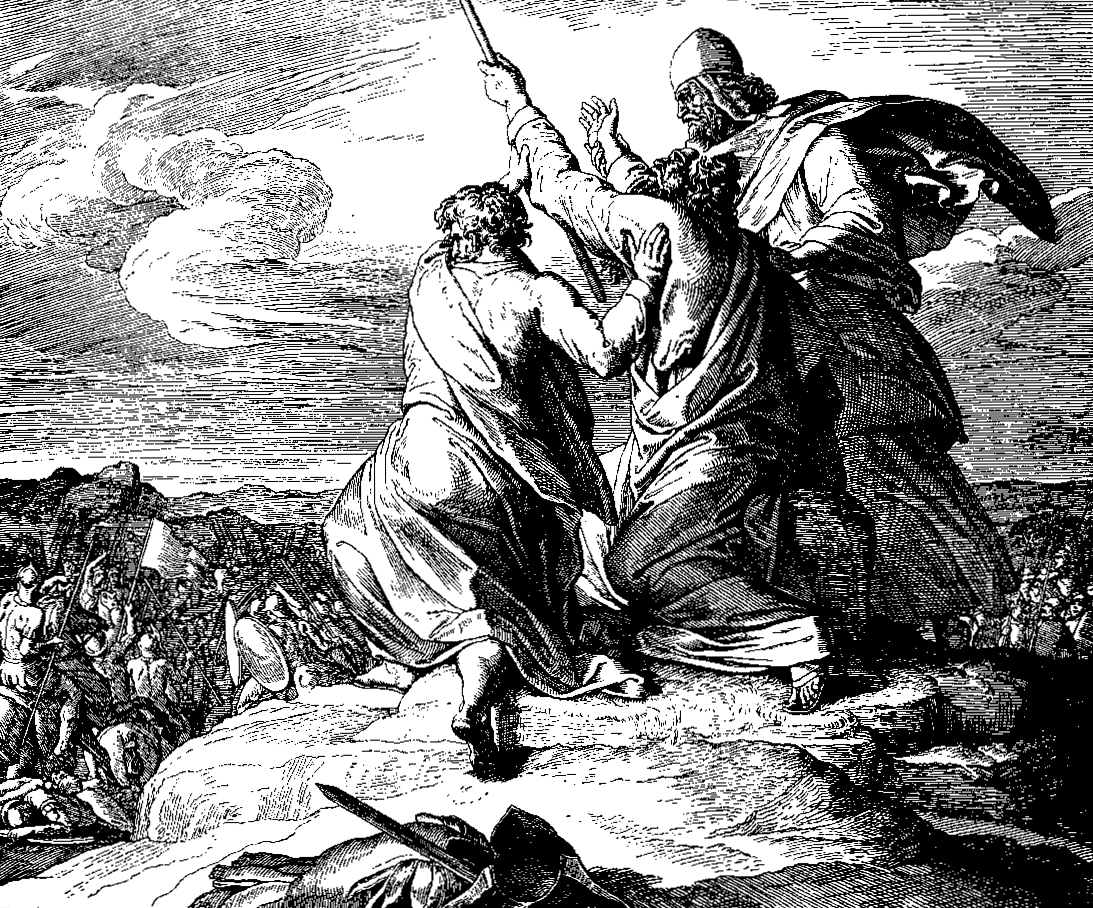
Battle with the Amalekites, by Julius Schnorr von Carolsfeld (1860), representing Exodus 17:8–16.

Hur is also mentioned as the grandfather of Bezalel, designated by God to be the principal creator of the Tabernacle and the Ark of the Covenant. Though it is not entirely certain that this Hur is the same individual, he has been treated as such in Jewish tradition.

In the Books of Chronicles Hur is either the son or the father of Caleb. The language is sufficiently ambiguous that different interpretations are possible. The King James Version of the Bible states, "These were the sons of Caleb the son of Hur, the firstborn of Ephratah; Shobal the father of Kirjathjearim". The New International Version has "These were the sons of Caleb. The sons of Hur, the firstborn of Ephrathah, were Shobal the father of Kiriath-jearim". The first version is consistent with I Chronicles 4:4, indicating that "Caleb" is another son or another name for one of the other sons of Hur, and that Hur is another name of Hezron the son of Pharez (and thus the grandson of Judah). The second version places a different Hur as the first child of Caleb by his second wife Ephrath.

A notable son of Hur was Uri the father of Bezalel. Hur's three notable grandsons, Shobal, Salma, and Hareph, were said to have been the fathers of the men that founded the towns of Kirjath-jearim, Bethlehem, and Bethgader respectively. Additionally, I Chronicles 4:4 calls Hur (the son of Ephratah) the father of Bethlehem, apparently as a teknonym from the prominence of his descendant Salma's son Bethlehem.

== Rabbinical commentary ==
Exodus 38:22 states explicitly Hur's descendants: "And Bezalel son of Uri, son of Hur...", but not directly his parental lineage, except that he was from the tribe of Judah.

According to Rabbinic tradition, Hur was the son of Miriam, thus Moses and Aaron's nephew. The Talmud (Sanhedrin 69b & Sotah 11b) states that Caleb, a descendant from Judah, married Miriam and fathered Hur. This is based on the Targum to I Chron. 2:19: "...and Caleb took for himself Ephrath and she bore him Hur". Ephrath was another name for Miriam. Rashi's Bible commentary justifies this position on the two other locations in Exodus where Hur is mentioned: 17:10 & 24:14. However, Josephus in Antiquities of the Jews states that Hur was the husband of Moses' sister Miriam.

In Talmudic tradition the sudden disappearance of Hur from the narrative of Exodus is explained by the claim that Hur was killed when he tried to prevent the making of the Golden Calf. The murder of Hur intimidated Aaron into complying with the popular demand to create the idol. Hur's faithfulness was rewarded by God by granting his grandson the role of making the Tabernacle.

== Other Hurs ==
It is the traditional view that Hur, the companion of Moses, is the same as the grandfather of Bezalel, but this is not certain. Other persons named Hur include:

=== Hur, a King of the Midianites ===
He was killed with four other Midianite kings during the time of Moses by an Israelite expedition led by Phinehas, son of Eleazar. Balaam, son of Beor, was also slain by the Israelites in this expedition (Num. 31:8; Joshua 13:21).

=== Hur, the Father of Rephaiah ===
He is only mentioned in his relationship to Rephaiah (Nehemiah 3:9); there are no other biographical data regarding him. While it is possible it could refer to one of the other persons by the name of Hur (other than the King of Midian) if "Rephaiah the son of Hur" means Hur was an ancestor and not a biological father, it is extremely unlikely.
