= Shea =

Shea is an Irish surname that is also used in some countries as a gender neutral given name.

Shea may refer to:

== People ==
=== Surname ===
- Alan Shea (born 1958), Manx gay rights campaigner
- Brek Shea (born 1990), American soccer player
- Charles W. Shea (1921–1994), United States Army officer
- Cornelius Shea (1872–1929), American labor leader and crime boss
- Danny Shea (footballer) (1887–1960), English footballer
- Dave Shea (broadcaster) (born c. 1950), in American hockey
- Dermot Shea (born 1969), American police officer
- Dorothy Shea, American diplomat
- Dorothy Shea (librarian) (1941–2024), Australian librarian
- Eric Shea (born 1960), American actor
- Francis Shea (disambiguation)
- Gail Shea (1959–2025), Canadian politician
- Gilbert Shea (1928–2020), American amateur tennis player
- George Beverly Shea (1909–2013), Canadian-American singer-songwriter
- Gerald Shea (disambiguation)
- Glenn Michael Shea (born 1961), Australian Herpetologist
- Gwyn Shea (born 1937), American politician in Texas
- H. James Shea, Jr. (1939-1970), American politician
- Jack Shea (speed skater) (1910–2002), American speed skater
- Jack Shea (footballer) (1927–1983), Australian rules footballer
- Jack Shea (director) (1928–2013), American film/TV director
- James Shea (born 1991), English footballer
- Jamie Shea (born 1953), NATO official
- Jerry Shea (1892–1947), Welsh int'l rugby player
- Joe Shea (1947–2016), American activist/journalist & Shea v. Reno party
- John Shea (disambiguation)
- Joseph Shea (disambiguation)
- Judith Shea (born 1948), American sculptor
- Katriona Shea, British-American ecologist
- Kevin Shea (disambiguation)
- Kieran Shea (born 1965), American science fiction writer
- Michael Shea (disambiguation)
- Nap Shea (1874–1968), American baseball player
- Patrick Shea (disambiguation)
- Red Shea (baseball) (1898–1981), American baseball pitcher
- Red Shea (guitarist) (1938–2008), Canadian folk guitarist
- Robert Shea (1933–1994), American magazine editor and novelist
- Ryan Shea (born 1997), American ice hockey player
- Spec Shea, Francis Joseph "Spec" Shea (1920–2002) (eponym of Shea Stadium)
- Stephen Shea (born 1961), American former child actor
- Thomas Shea (1931-1982), American ragtime composer
- Tom J. Shea (born 1950), American businessman and politician
- William Shea (disambiguation)

=== Given name ===
- Shea Adam, American auto racing reporter
- Shea Backus (born 1975), American politician
- Shea Coulee, American drag performer, actor, recording artist, Winner RuPaul's Drag Race All Stars
- Shea Diamond (born 1978), American singer-songwriter
- Shea Fahy (born 1962), Irish former sportsperson who played Gaelic football
- Shea Hillenbrand (born 1975), American baseball player
- Shea Lacey (born 2007), English football player
- Shea Lolin (born 1983), British conductor, musician and media creative
- Shea Moyer (born 1998), American soccer player
- Shea Patterson (born 1997), American football player
- Shea Ralph (born 1978), American women's basketball player and coach
- Shea Showers (born 1974), American football player
- Shea Weber (born 1985), Canadian ice hockey player
- Shea Whigham (born 1969), American actor

== Fictional people ==
- Harold Shea, protagonist of The Incomplete Enchanter and sequels
- Shea Ohmsford, character in Terry Brooks's The Sword of Shannara

== Other uses ==
- Shea Stadium, demolished NYC sport venue
- USS Shea (DM-30), named for John Joseph Shea
- Shea butter, product of the shea tree.
- Skanderborg Håndbold Elite Academy, the youth team of the Danish handball club Skanderborg Håndbold

== See also ==
- Chaise
- Che (disambiguation)
- O'Shea
- Ó Sé
- Schea Cotton (born 1978), American basketball player
- Shae (given name)
- Shai (disambiguation)
- Shay (disambiguation)
- Shaylee (given name)
- Shays (disambiguation)
