= Shay =

Shay may refer to:

== People ==
Shay is primarily a Hebrew unisex name, meaning 'gift', deriving as a variation of Shai. Shay is also an Irish Gaelic name, a variant of the family name Shea. It is derived from O'Shea, which is anglicized from Ó Séaghdha.

=== Mononym ===
- Shay (singer), Shay Mooney, of American act "Dan + Shay"
- Shay (rapper), Belgian rapper

=== Given name ===
- Shay Bushinsky, Israeli computer programmer
- Shay Craig, American bishop

==== Entertainment industry ====
- Shay Astar (born 1981), American actress
- Shay Carl (born 1980), American YouTuber
- Shay Gabso (born 1984), Israeli singer
- Shay Haley (born 1975), (presumed) N*E*R*D musician
- Shay Hatten, American screenwriter
- Shay Healy, (1943–2021), Irish songwriter and broadcaster
- Shay Mitchell (born 1987), Canadian actress
- Shay Roundtree (born 1977), American actor
- Shay Youngblood, American creative writer

==== Sports ====
- Shay Abutbul (born 1983), Israeli footballer
- Shay Brennan (1937–2000), Irish footballer
- Shay Ciezki (born 2003), American basketball player
- Shay Doron (born 1985), (female) basketball player
- Shay Elliott (1934–1971), Irish road bicycle racer
- Shay Gibbons (1929–2006), Irish footballer
- Shay Given (born 1976), Irish footballer
- Shay Holtzman, Israeli footballer
- Shay Kakon (born 2002), (female) Israeli Olympic sailor
- Shay Kelly, English footballer
- Shay Keogh (1934–2020), Irish footballer
- Shay Konstantini (born 1996), Israeli footballer
- Shay Maloney (born 2000), American ice hockey player
- Shay Stephenson (born 1983), Canadian ice hockey player

=== Surname ===
- Anthony Shay, American dancer and choreographer
- Art Shay (1922-2018), American photographer
- Charles Norman Shay (1924–2025), American writer
- Dorothy Shay (1921–1978), American comedic recording artist and actress
- Ephraim Shay (1839–1916), American designer of the Shay locomotive
- Gene Shay (1935–2020), Philadelphia folk music figure
- Jennifer Shay (1930–2018), Canadian academic and ecologist
- Jerry Shay (born 1944), American football player
- Jonathan Shay (born 1941), American clinical psychiatrist
- Larry Shay (1897–1988), American songwriter
- Mildred Shay (1911–2005), American film actress
- Normand Shay (1899–1968), Canadian hockey player
- Paula Shay (1893–1972), American actress
- Ryan Shay (1979–2007), American long-distance runner
- Whitney Shay, American blues, soul, and rhythm and blues singer and songwriter

== Fictional characters ==
- Shay, human tribe in the Shadow World RPG campaign setting
- Shay, in Scott Westerfeld's Uglies series of novels
- Shay Bourne, in the novel Change of Heart
- Shay Patrick Cormac, protagonist in the video game Assassin's Creed Rogue
- Carly Shay and Spencer Shay, in American TV series iCarly
- Shay Turner, in Australian–New Zealand TV series 800 Words
- Pearl Shay, in American situation comedy 227
- Leslie Shay, in American TV series Chicago Fire

== Transportation ==
- Shay, alternative spelling for chaise (carriage)
- One-horse shay, a light, covered two-wheeled carriage for two persons
- Shay locomotive, a type of steam locomotive patented and popularized by Ephraim Shay
- Shay Motors Corporation, American automobile company 1978–1982

== Other uses ==
- Shay, Arabic tea
- Shay's Warehouse and Stable, in New Hamburg, New York
- The Shay, Halifax Town F.C. and RLFC venue, England
- Shays' Rebellion, in the United States in the 1780s
- Shay, a short story collection by Rabindranath Tagore

== See also ==
- Ó Sé
- O'Shea
- Shai (disambiguation)
- Shays (disambiguation)
- Shea (disambiguation)
