= Botin =

Botin or Botín may refer to:

== People ==
- Ana Patricia Botín (born 1960), Spanish banker
- Emilio Botín (1903–1993), Spanish banker
- Emilio Botín (1934–2014), Spanish banker
- Jaime Botín (1936–2024), Spanish billionaire heir and banker
- Vicente Botín, Spanish journalist

== Other ==
- Botin, a mount in Kurdistan
- Botin River, a river in Romania.
- Sobrino de Botín, a restaurant in Madrid, Spain, founded in 1725.
- Bohutín (Šumperk District), a village in the Czech Republic
- Botines, Texas, a small town in Texas
