= Shai (disambiguation) =

Shai was the deification of the concept of fate in Egyptian mythology.

Shai may also refer to:

== People and characters ==
=== Persons ===
- Shai (given name), includes list of people with the name
  - Shai Gilgeous-Alexander (born 1998), Canadian basketball player

==== Persons with the surname ====
- Hezi Shai (Hebrew: חזי שי, born 1954), Israeli soldier
- Hila Shai Vazan (Hebrew: הילה שי-וזאן, born 1980), Israeli journalist and politician
- Isaac Shai (born 1971), South African soccer player
- Nachman Shai (Hebrew: נחמן שי; born 1946), Israeli journalist and politician
- Patrick Shai (1956–2022), South African actor
- Siyabulela Shai (born 1993), South African soccer player

=== Fictional characters ===
- Shedao Shai, a Star Wars fictional character, a commander of the Yuuzhan Vong, in the Star Wars Legends subfranchise (the Star Wars Expanded Universe, SWEU)

== Places ==
- Shai Hills, Dangme West District, Greater Accra, Ghana
- Shai, Greater Accra, Ghana; a plain, see Shai Hills
- S'hai (Shanghai), China

== Other uses ==
- Shai (band), American 1990s vocal R&B/soul quartet
- Shai (Haganah unit), former intelligence and counter-espionage arm of the Haganah

== See also ==
- Shais Rishon (born 1982). African-American rabbi
- Shais Taub, American rabbi
- Mantri Ananda Shai (18th century), royal of Manipur, Indian Subcontinent
- Shai Shai, Gaza, Mozambique
- Shai-Osudoku constituency, Tema, Greater Accra, Ghana
- Shai Osudoku District, Greater Accra, Ghana
- SHA1
- Shal (disambiguation)
- Shaw (disambiguation)
- Shah (disambiguation)
- Shae (disambiguation)
- Shay (disambiguation)
- Shy (disambiguation)
- Sha (disambiguation)
