= Michael O'Shea =

Michael or Mike O'Shea may refer to:

- Michael O'Shea (actor) (1906–1973), American character actor
- Michael O'Shea (musician) (1947–1991), Northern Irish musician
- Mike O'Shea (Canadian football) (born 1970), Head Coach of the Winnipeg Blue Bombers of the Canadian Football League, & former Canadian football linebacker
- Mike O'Shea (cricketer) (born 1987), Welsh cricketer
- Mike O'Shea (adventurer) (born 1969), Irish adventurer and safety consultant

== See also ==
- Michael Shea (disambiguation)
