= Albéniz Foundation =

Private non-profit organization promoting classical music in Spain

The Albéniz Foundation (Fundación Albéniz in Spanish), is a private non-profit organisation promoting classical music in Spain through its programmes: the Reina Sofía School of Music, the Paloma O'Shea International Piano Competition, the Isaac Albéniz Library and Research Centre, and the International Chamber Music Institute of Madrid. The foundation is named after the Spanish composer and pianist Isaac Albéniz, as he represents the renaissance of Spanish music at the beginning of the 20th century in Europe. The foundation is based in Madrid and has a permanent office in Santander.

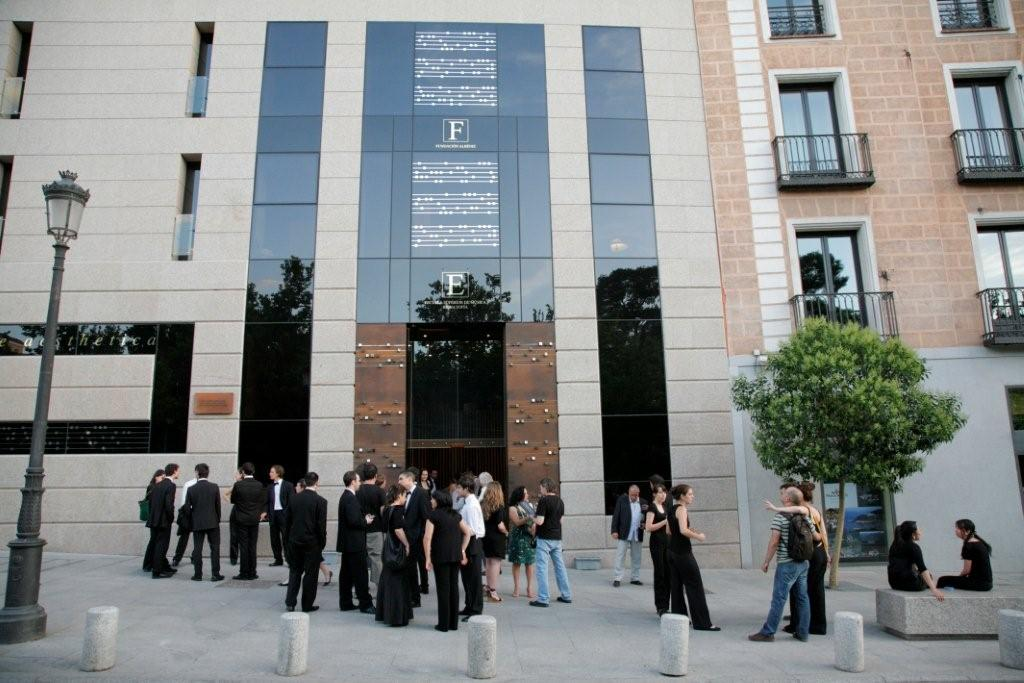
Fundación Albéniz in Madrid

The Albéniz Foundation was founded in 1972 by Paloma O'Shea, who is the current president of the foundation. The Honorary President is the Infanta Margarita and the Honorary Vice President was Alicia de Larrocha. Plácido Domingo, Montserrat Caballé, Zubin Mehta, Joaquín Soriano and several members of the Botín family are members of the board of trustees.

== Activities of the Foundation ==
=== Reina Sofía School of Music ===
The Reina Sofía School of Music is a private music conservatory in Madrid.

=== Isaac Albéniz Library and Research Centre ===
The centre houses the Isaac Albéniz and Federico Mompou archives and the Arthur Rubinstein archive (donated in 1982 by Nela Rubinstein).

=== Paloma O'Shea International Piano Competition ===
The Paloma O'Shea International Piano Competition, formerly known as Concurso de Piano de Santander, is a major music competition happening in Santander, Spain, every three years.

=== Yehudi Menuhin Prize ===
Created in 1990, the Yehudi Menuhin Prize, is an award given by the Reina Sofía School of Music to recognize and reward artists of excellence, who have contributed a great deal to the teaching of music. It has been given to Alfredo Kraus, Piero Farulli, Sir Colin Davis, and Carlo Maria Giulini.
