= Patrick Shea =

Patrick Shea may refer to:

- Patrick Shea (civil servant) (1908–1986), Northern Irish civil servant
- Patrick Shea (Utah lawyer) (born 1948), American lawyer known for freedom of the press cases
- Patrick Shea (California lawyer), American lawyer that represented Orange County, California in their financial restructuring
- Paddy Shea (1886–1954), Australian rules footballer
- Red Shea (baseball) (Patrick Henry Shea, 1898–1981), Major League Baseball pitcher

== See also ==
- Pat Shea (disambiguation)
