= The Real Geeks =

The Real Geeks (TRG Magazine)
- Available in: English
- Headquarters: Atlanta, Georgia; Raleigh, North Carolina
- Editors: Ian Webb; Sam Linville
- Website: therealgeeks.com
- Launched: January 2011
- Current status: Offline

The Real Geeks (however referred to as TRG Magazine) is a "geek culture" online magazine website with biweekly coverage of news and reviews in sections such as technology, music, entertainment, travel, and more, released in issues published every other Friday. The Real Geeks website was launched on January 10, 2011, by Ian Webb and Sam Linville, however the website has grown to have a full, operational staff.

== History ==
Founder Ian Webb began developing The Real Geeks in October 2010. During the week of January 3, 2011, Webb finalized plans for The Real Geeks and version 1 of the site was officially launched on January 10. Due to the immediate heightened popularity and the multiple elements of The Real Geeks, the TRG Executive Team founded a parent company for The Real Geeks which they entitled TRG Media (the name reflects TRG, the flagship website). TRG Media also manages other online identities for other projects. After the closure of TRG Techcasts, TRG Media was officially dissolved in April 2012 and the company is now only The Real Geeks.

In November 2012, The Real Geeks went under a major renovation with an entirely new design on the website, corporate attitude, and style of writing. The renovation was met with positive feedback from users and the website continuously updates with new features and improvements.

In November 2013, the website was taken offline and a new direction of content was teased. The website relaunched on February 10, 2014, for a soft opening with a new design and the new "culture-based" content focus. The website was met with positive reviews from readers and other critics. However, the publication was taken offline once again, and was officially relaunched with the new issue format and a custom design on the Kirby CMS.

== Consumer Electronics Show ==
The Real Geeks was invited to attend the 2012 International Consumer Electronics Show in Las Vegas, Nevada as members of the press. Current editor-in-chief, Ian Webb, and current CIO, Russ Webb, attended the show as representatives of TRG.

Due to the coverage put out by TRG during CES 2012, the website has grown in popularity due to mentions on the websites of several large corporations including Schlage, OtterBox, Zagg, and more. The website also gained ground on social networks due to the continuous coverage via Twitter, Facebook, and the TRG website.

The Real Geeks team attended the show again in 2013 with Southwest Airlines as the primary sponsor of coverage. The Real Geeks had exclusive content from several major corporations including Sony, Huawei, OtterBox, etc.

The team was invited to attend again in 2014, however due to the impending launch of the new website, they declined to attend.

== Editors ==
Position	Name(s)
Editor in Chief	Ian Webb
Executive Editor	Sam Linville
Contributing Editors	Kimberlyn Hughes; Mariett Romtvedt; Kendall Uvena; Russ Webb
Columnist	Van Rabern

== Other projects ==
=== TRG Techcasts ===
On February 22, 2012, editor-in-chief Ian Webb announced that The Real Geeks would be introducing their own podcast network (entitled TRG Techcasts) containing five shows. The network was on-air for 3 weeks, when on March 16, The Real Geeks announced that the network was to be put on hiatus indefinitely.

The original five shows to the network were: AppFeast -hosted by Andrew Kunesh and Rebecca Teigh, Innovation Station -hosted by Rey Shaw, Sixty Second Tech -hosted by Russ Webb, TRG Week in Review -hosted by Ian Webb, and Within the Aperture -hosted by Hunter McLean.

Editor-in-chief Ian Webb made an announcement via his personal Twitter account on April 10, 2012, that The Real Geeks will be starting back up the TRG Techcasts network, and the network is looking for new hosts.

At the end of April 2012, Webb announced that the TRG Techcasts project had been shut down to focus on other aspects of the website.
