= Shaylee =

Shaylee is a feminine given name of Gaelic origin. The name means "admirable" and is related to the Irish name Shea.

Other alternate variant(s) of the name is/are Shayla and Shayle.

This name can be also an anglicized version of the Hebrew name Shaili, a combination of the names Shai and Li, which gives the meaning of "gift for me".

Notable people with the name include:

- Shaylee Bent (born 2000), an Australian rugby league footballer
- Shaylee Chuckulnaskit (2000–2014), a victim of the 2014 Marysville Pilchuck High School shooting
- Shaylee Curnow (born 1998), Australian singer and songwriter known professionally as Peach PRC
- Shaylee Gonzales (born 2000), American basketball player
- Shaylee Mansfield (born 2009), deaf American actress and YouTuber

== See also ==
- Shae (given name)
- Shea (disambiguation)
