= Red Shea =

Red Shea may refer to:

- Red Shea (baseball)
- Red Shea (guitarist)
