= Pat Shea =

Pat Shea may refer to:

- Pat Shea (ice hockey) (1911–1978), American ice hockey
- Pat Shea (American football) (1939–2013), American football player
- Red Shea (baseball) (Patrick Henry Shea, 1898–1981), Major League Baseball pitcher
