= Michael Shea =

Michael Shea or Mike Shea may refer to:

- Michael Shea (actor) (born 1952), American child/teen actor
- Michael Shea (American author) (1946–2014), American fantasy/horror/sci-fi writer
- Michael Shea (diplomat) (1938–2009), Scottish press secretary to Queen Elizabeth II and author
- Michael Shea (ice hockey) (born 1961), Austrian ice hockey player
- Michael A. Shea (1894–1954), Newfoundland politician
- Michael P. Shea (born 1967), American attorney and United States district judge
- Mike Shea (baseball) (1867–1927), American Major League pitcher for the Cincinnati Reds
- Mike Shea (snowboarder) (born 1983), American para-snowboarder
- Mike Shea (born 1966), founder, president, and CEO of Alternative Press magazine

== See also ==
- Michael O'Shea (disambiguation)
- Shea (disambiguation)
