= Gerald Shea =

Gerald Shea could refer to:

- Gerald Shea (district attorney), American attorney from California
- Gerald W. Shea (1931–2015), American politician from Illinois
- Gerry Shea (1881–1964), American baseball player

== See also ==
- Jerry Shay (born 1944), American football player
- Jere Shea (born 1965), American actor
- Jerry Shea (1892–1947), Welsh rugby player
