= Ana Botín =

Spanish businesswoman, banker (born 1960)

Ana Botín DBE
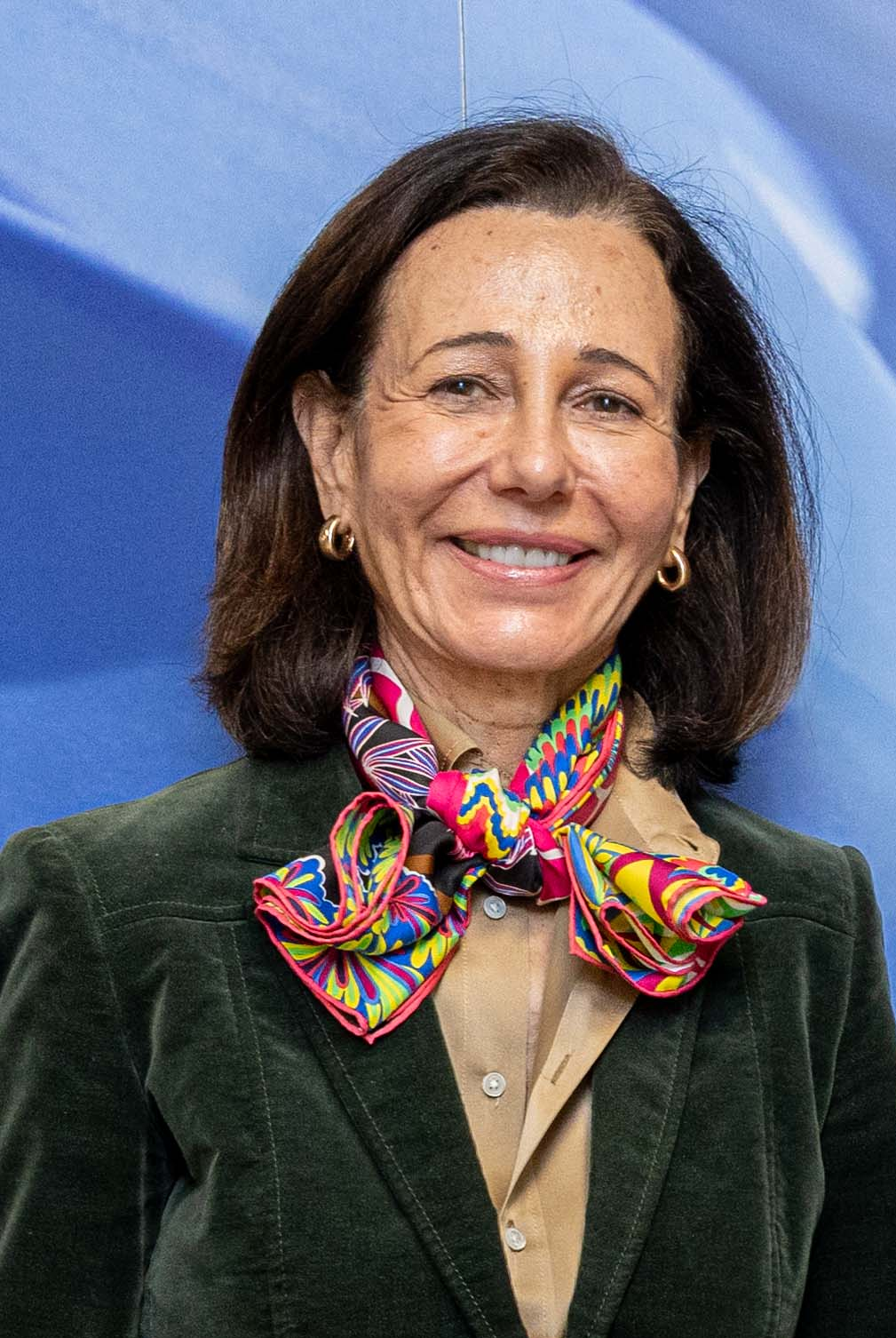
- Botín in 2025
- Born: Ana Patricia Botín O'Shea; 4 October 1960 (age 66); Santander, Spain
- Education: St Mary's School Ascot; Bryn Mawr College
- Occupations: Chairman, Santander Group
- Employers: JP Morgan; Santander Group
- Spouse: Guillermo Morenés y Mariátegui (m. 1983)
- Children: 3
- Parents: Emilio Botín; Paloma O'Shea
- Relatives: Jaime Botín (uncle); Diego Botín (nephew)

Ana Patricia Botín-Sanz de Sautuola O'Shea DBE (born 4 October 1960) is a Spanish banker who has been the executive chairman of Santander Group since 2014. She is the fourth generation of the Botín family to hold the role. Before that, she was chief executive of Santander UK from December 2010 until September 2014.

In February 2013, Botín was ranked the third most powerful woman in the UK by Woman's Hour on BBC Radio 4. In 2017, 2019, and 2020, Forbes ranked her the 8th most powerful woman in the world. Forbes ranked her 18th in the list of "World's 100 most powerful women" in 2023.

She was ranked 19th on Fortune's list of 100 Most Powerful Women in 2023.

== Early life ==
Botín was born on 4 October 1960 in Santander, Spain. She is the daughter of Spanish banker Emilio Botín-Sanz de Sautuola y García de los Ríos, who was the executive chairman of Spain's Grupo Santander, and Paloma O'Shea, 1st Marchioness of O'Shea. She received her high school education at St Mary's School Ascot. She studied economics at Bryn Mawr College.

== Career ==
Botín worked at JP Morgan in the US from 1981 to 1988. In 1988, she returned to Spain and began working for the Santander Group. During that time, she was involved in the bank's 1997 acquisition of a 51 percent stake in Banco Osorno y La Union, the largest bank in Chile, for $495 million. In 2002, she became the executive chairman of the Spanish bank, Banesto. In November 2010, Botín succeeded António Horta Osório as chief executive of Santander UK.

In 2013, Botín was appointed a director of the Coca-Cola Company.

In September 2014, Botín was appointed chair of the Santander Group. She is the fourth generation of the Botín family to hold this role. Since taking charge she has brought in more international board members, embraced technology and strengthened the US and Latin America management teams.

In February 2025, Santander reported that Botín earned €13.77 million in 2024—up 13%—comprising €7.94 million in cash, €3.96 million in equity, €1.34 million in pension contributions, and €0.54 million in other benefits.

== Other activities ==
In 2015, Prime Minister David Cameron of the United Kingdom named Botín to become a member of his business advisory board. In 2020, the International Monetary Fund's Managing Director Kristalina Georgieva appointed her to an external advisory group to provide input on policy challenges. In early 2021, she was appointed by the G20 to the High Level Independent Panel (HLIP) on financing the global commons for pandemic preparedness and response, co-chaired by Ngozi Okonjo-Iweala, Tharman Shanmugaratnam and Lawrence Summers.

Other positions include:

- The Business Council, Member
- Mayor's Fund for London, Member of the Board of Trustees (since 2012)
- Bilderberg Group, Member of the Steering Committee
- Elcano Royal Institute for International and Strategic Studies, Member of the Board of Trustees
- Fundación Albéniz, Member of the Board of Trustees
- Fundación Conocimiento y Desarrollo (Fundación CYD), Founder and President
- Fundación Mujeres por África, Member of the Board of Trustees
- Institute of International Finance (IFF), Chair-Elect
- National Museum and Research Center of Altamira, Member of the Board of Trustees

== Recognition ==
First listed in 2005, Botín was ranked as the eighth most powerful woman in the world by Forbes in 2018, 2019, and 2020.

- 2015 – Dame Commander of the Order of the British Empire for services to the British financial sector
- 2015 – FIRST Award for Responsible Capitalism

== Personal life ==
In 1983, Botín married fellow banker Guillermo Morenés y Mariátegui, son of the 9th Marquess of Borghetto, a wealthy landowner. They have three sons.

The family owns a large estate in Ciudad Real, south of Madrid. In 2010, Morenés y Mariátegui bought a six-bedroom home in Belgravia, London. They also own a house in the Swiss ski resort of Gstaad.

She is a two-time national junior golf champion who learnt the sport from former World No. 1 Seve Ballesteros, her late brother-in-law. In 2018 she became the fourth female member of the Augusta National Golf Club. She is the aunt of Olympic gold medalist Diego Botín, and the niece of Jaime Botín.

== See also ==
- List of female top executives
- Banco Santander
- Santander UK
