= Shy (disambiguation) =

Shy is an adjective describing a person with shyness.

Shy or SHY may also refer to:

== Aviation ==
- Shinyanga Airport (IATA airport code), Tanzania
- Sky Airlines (ICAO code), former airline based in Turkey

== Music ==
- Shy (band), UK
- SHY & DRS, Scots singing duo
- Shy (album), by Stacey Solomon, 2025
- "Shy", a song by K.Flay from Mono, 2023
- "Shy", a song by Mabel from About Last Night..., 2022
- "Shy", a song by Prince from The Gold Experience, 1995
- "Shy", a song by Reneé Rapp from Bite Me, 2025
- "Shy", a song by Sonata Arctica from Successor and Takatalvi, 2000

== Sport ==
- Throw-in (Scottish: "shy"), in football
  - Shy, the equivalent in shinty

== People ==
=== Surname ===
- Carl Shy (1908–1991), American basketball player
- Christopher Shy, artist
- John Shy, American military historian and professor
- Robert Shy (German), American drummer

=== Given name ===
- Shy Arkin (born 1965), Israeli biochemist
- Shy Carter (born 1984), American songwriter
- Shy Keenan, British author
- Shy Martin (born 1993), Swedish artist

== Other uses ==
- Coconut shy, a traditional game frequently found as a sidestall at funfairs
- Shy (manga), a Japanese manga series
- Shy (company), an Italian women's shoe brand
- Soft hyphen (HTML character entity &shy;), an indication of an optional hyphenation point in a word
- Shawiya language (ISO 639-3 code)

== See also ==
- Stranger anxiety
