= Shae (given name) =

Shae is a unisex given name of recent origin, and may refer to:

- John Shae Perring (1813–1869), British engineer
- Shae Anderson (born 1999), American athlete
- Shae Audley (born 1988), Australian rules footballer
- Shae Bolton (born 1989), Australian netball player
- Shae-Lynn Bourne (born 1976), Canadian ice dancer and choreographer
- Shae Cahill (born 2005), English footballer
- Shae Davies (born 1990), Australian professional racing driver
- Shae D'lyn (born 1963), American actress
- Shae Dupuy (born 1995), Canadian country singer and songwriter
- Shae Fiol (born 1978), Cuban-American singer-songwriter
- Shae Graham (born 1986), Australian wheelchair rugby player
- Shae Holmes (born 2000), American soccer player
- Shae Jones (born 1978), American singer-songwriter
- Shae Kelley (born 1991), American women's basketball player
- Shae Lillywhite (born 1985), Australian baseball player
- Shae Marks (born 1972), American adult model
- Shae Simmons (born 1990), American baseball player
- Shae Sloane (born 1992), professional Australian rules footballer
- Shae Sortwell (born 1985), American truck driver and politician
- Shae Yanez (born 1997), American soccer player

== See also ==
- Shea (disambiguation)
- Shaylee (given name)
