= Clare O'Leary =

Irish mountain climber

Clare O'Leary (born 1972) is an Irish gastroenterologist, mountain climber and adventurer. She was the first Irish woman to climb Mount Everest and complete the Seven Summits.

== Career ==
=== Medicine ===
O'Leary developed an interest in medicine, and cancer in particular, when her uncle died from lung cancer during her childhood. After graduating from University College Cork, she spent over ten years training and working at the Cork University Hospital. She currently works as a consultant gastroenterologist and general physician at Tipperary University Hospital. She is also a patron of the Cork University Hospital Charity.

=== Mountaineering and adventure ===
O'Leary made her name in mountaineering in 2004, when she became the first Irish woman to reach the summit of Mount Everest, having failed on her first attempt in 2003 due to gastroenteritis. She climbed as a member of the Wyeth Irish Everest Expedition, led by Pat Falvey. She also became the first Irish woman to ascend the Himalayan peak Ama Dablam and to climb the Seven Summits—the highest mountains on each continent. In 2008, O'Leary joined the Beyond Endurance expedition led by Falvey to the South Pole, making her the first woman to successfully ski to the South Pole.

In 2012, O'Leary and Mike O'Shea set out on an ongoing series of expeditions that they called the Ice Project; their aim is to cross all of the world's largest ice caps. Some of these expeditions included crossings of the Northern Patagonian Ice Field, the Greenland ice sheet, and Lake Baikal. In 2014, they plan to attempt to ski to the North Pole after their 2012 North Pole trek was cancelled due to a logistics problem; this attempt will be O'Leary's fourth and O'Shea's second. They hope to be the first Irish people to reach the North Pole. A successful trip to the North Pole would also make O'Leary the second woman to climb the Seven Summits and reach both poles.

In 2013, the railway path between Bandon and Innishannon in County Cork was named the Dr Clare O'Leary Walk to commemorate her achievements.

In December 2020, O'Leary was awarded the Mountaineering Ireland Lyman Medal in recognition of her mountaineering and exploration achievements.

== Personal life ==
O'Leary lives in Clonmel, and is in a relationship with Mike O'Shea, with whom she frequently partners for her expeditions.
