= Pat Falvey =

Irish explorer

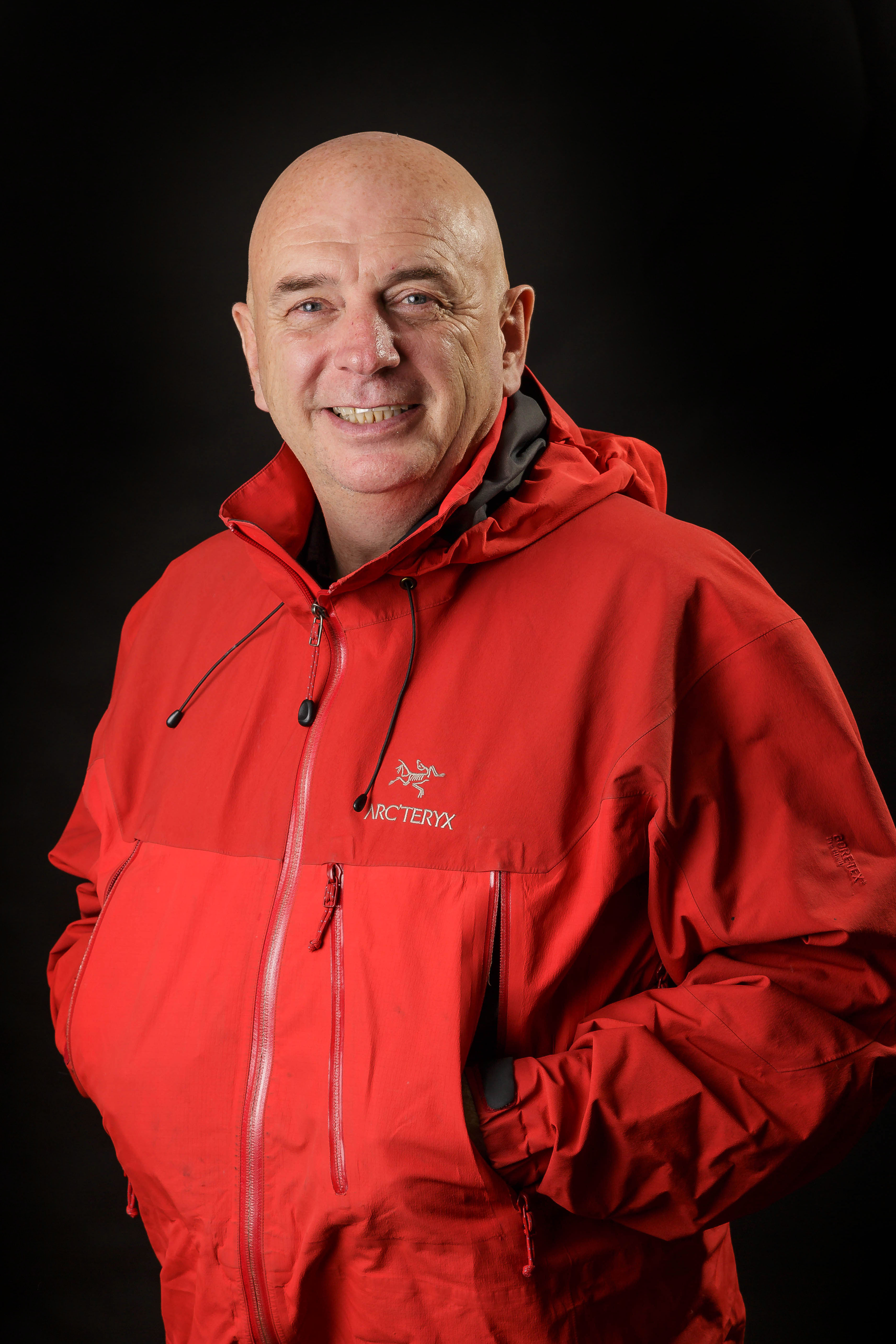
- Born: County Cork, Ireland
- Occupations: Mountaineer, Adventurer, Explorer, Speaker, Mentor, Coach, Author, Entrepreneur.
- Known for: First person to do the Seven Summits twice including Mount Everest from the Tibetan and Nepalese sides, Leader of the largest team to transverse South Georgia, Leader of First Irish team to reach the Southpole.
- Children: 2 sons
- Website: www.patfalvey.com

Pat Falvey is an Irish high-altitude mountaineer, expedition leader, polar explorer, entrepreneur, author, corporate/personal trainer/coach, and motivational speaker. He was the first person to complete the Seven Summits (Bass) twice, with the summiting of Mount Everest reached from both the Tibetan (1996) and Nepalese sides (2004). He was expedition leader of the team that saw Clare O'Leary become the first Irish woman to reach the summit of Mount Everest (2004). Other extreme expeditions that he has made include walking to the South Pole, crossing South Georgia Island, and traversing the Greenland ice cap. He started his first business at 15 years of age and has since had businesses in property development, finance, construction, insurance, tourism, and film production. He has been a motivational speaker since the 1990s.

== Early life ==
Born and raised on the north side of Cork city, Ireland, Falvey started mountain climbing in his late twenties, having worked as a builder and property developer from his late teens onwards. Following the economic recession of the mid-1980s in Ireland, he lost most of his wealth and discovered mountaineering in his late 20s.

== Mountain climbing career ==
Falvey began his climbing career with hill walking and climbing on the McGillycuddy Reeks in County Kerry, Ireland. Falvey then devoted himself to training to become a high-altitude mountaineer. He trained initially with the Cork Mountaineering Club, at Tiglin in County Wicklow and became a member of Kerry Mountain Rescue, climbing very frequently in Ireland, Scotland, France and the Himalayas.

In June 1994, Falvey climbed Denali in Alaska, reaching the first summit in his Seven Summits attempt. This was followed by Kilimanjaro in Tanzania (January 1995); Mount Everest via the Northeast Ridge (June 1995); Aconcagua in Argentina (December 1995); Mount Elbrus in Russia (March 1996); Mount Vinson in Antarctica (January 1997) and Mount Kosciusko in Australia (February 1997). He was the first Irish man (and the 32nd person in the world) to complete the Seven Summits.

Falvey was the expedition leader of the first Irish team to reach the summit of Cho Oyu in China and Nepal without oxygen, on 20 May 1998. He reached the summit of Ama Dablam in Nepal on 3 November 1999. In 2003, Falvey was the expedition leader of the first Irish team to reach the summit of Mount Everest via the South-Southeast Ridge, with team members Ger McDonnell and Mick Murphy reaching the summit. On 18 May 2004, Falvey reached the summit of Everest via the South-Southeast Ridge, and led the expedition that saw the first Irish woman, Dr Clare O'Leary, reach the top of Everest.

Falvey and O'Leary completed the Seven Summits on 16 December 2005, when Falvey became the first person to complete the Seven Summits twice by climbing Mount Everest from both the Tibetan and Nepalese sides.

== Polar career ==
In 2006, Falvey led a group of 32 across the South Georgia Traverse on South Georgia Island in honour of Polar explorers Sir Ernest Shackleton and Kerryman Tom Crean, in the Beyond Endurance Antarctic expedition. He led the first Irish traverse of Greenland in 2006. In January 2008, he led a four-person Irish expedition to the South Pole. In April 2009, Falvey and O'Leary did a 'symbolic' walk to the North Pole, completing the final four-day trek to the Pole.

== Gaelic games ==
He joined the Kerry county football team as a "sports performance coach" in 2021. Manager Peter Keane said: "You take us in this country with five million people and we have had some unbelievable adventurers like Shackleton and Crean; you look at someone like Pat who has climbed Everest twice from two different sides, managed to climb the Seven Summits twice, and I am looking to see if he can bring something different in here".

== Publications ==
Falvey, Pat, with Collins, Dan (1997). Reach for the Sky, Cork, Ireland, The Collins Press. ISBN 1898256322.

Falvey, Pat, (2007). A Journey to Adventure: Stories I never thought I’d tell, Cork, Ireland, The Collins Press. ISBN 9781905172535.

Falvey, Pat, with Gyalje Sherpa, Pemba (2013). The Summit: How Triumph Turned To Tragedy On K2’s Deadliest Days, Kerry and Dublin, Ireland, Beyond Endurance Publishing with The O’Brien Press. ISBN 978184717-6431.

Falvey, Pat, (2016). You Have The Power: Explore The Mindset You Need To Realise Your Dreams, Kerry, Ireland, Beyond Endurance Publishing. ISBN 978099271-2525.

Falvey, Pat, (2018). Accidental Rebel, Kerry, Ireland, Beyond Endurance Publishing. ISBN 978099271-2556.

== Other work ==
- Against the Sky: The Incredible Story of an Irish Expedition to climb Mount Everest, a Kevin Hughes Film. Executive producer Pat Falvey.
- The Summit, an Image Now Films and Pat Falvey Irish and Worldwide Productions production about the 2008 climbing season on K2 in which eleven climbers died. Executive producer, Pat Falvey.
- My Private Everest, a three-part documentary for television on Falvey. Athena Media, Dublin. Ireland.
- Beyond Endurance, a four-part TV miniseries.

== See also ==
- List of Mount Everest summiters by number of times to the summit
