= Mike O'Shea (adventurer) =

Irish adventurer and safety consultant (born 1969)

Mike O'Shea FRGS
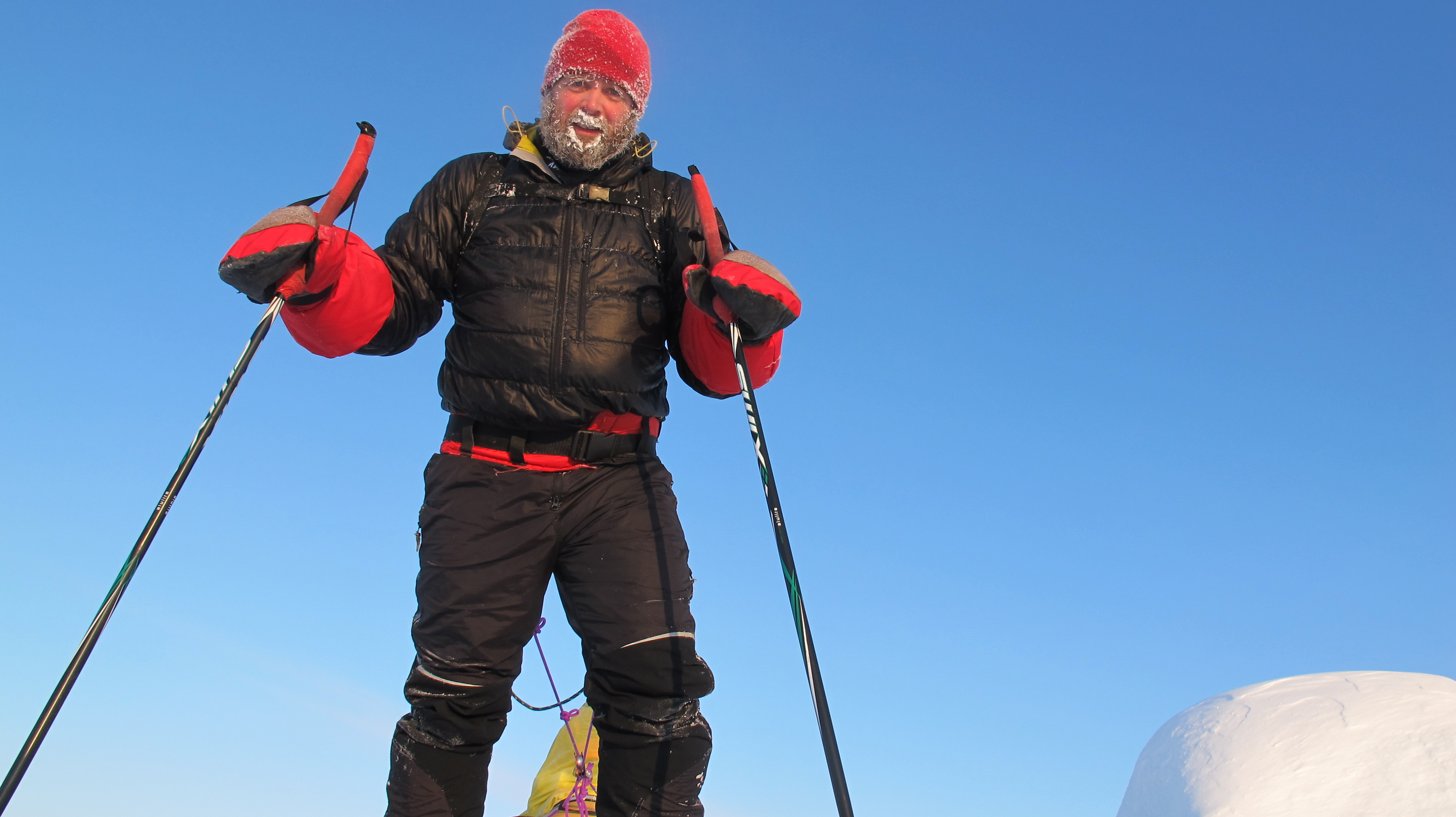
- O'Shea skiing at Cape Discovery in 2012
- Born: Micheal O'Shea; 2 December 1969 (age 56); Watford, England
- Occupations: Adventurer; heights safety and rescue consultant
- Website: mikeoshea.ie

Mike O'Shea FRGS (born 2 December 1969) is an Irish adventurer and safety consultant.

== Career ==
=== Mountaineering ===
O'Shea's climbing career began at the age of 13 when he started climbing in the MacGillycuddy's Reeks near his home-place in County Kerry, Ireland. He was one of the first people in Ireland to gain the Gold Gaisce – The President's Award. He went on to climb extensively in the European Alps and internationally. He volunteered in Kerry Mountain Rescue for 10 years.

In 1991, O'Shea was part of an Irish team which attempted the southwest ridge of Ama Dablam, one of whom (Mick Murphy) summitted. O'Shea was part of the 1993 K2 West Ridge expedition (also known as the Three Cups of Tea Expedition).

O'Shea has also climbed Aoraki / Mount Cook in New Zealand, spent 6 summers climbing in the Alps and climbed extensively in Papua.

=== Powered paragliding ===
Having flown traditional paragliders for many years he took up Powered paragliding in 2009 and in the same year was one of the first people to fly cross the Irish Sea with one. He also became the first person to fly the length of Ireland from Mizen Head to Malin Head in June 2014

=== Adventure ===
In 2012, O'Shea began a series of expeditions called The Ice Project, aiming to cross all of the world's major ice caps with fellow adventurer Clare O'Leary. O'Shea and O'Leary made an unsuccessful attempt to be the first Irish team to walk to the North Pole in early 2012; logistics difficulties have been stated as the reason for the team aborting their attempt.

In November 2013, the pair completed a 19-day crossing of the Northern Patagonian Ice Field, becoming the first Irish team to do so. In March 2013, O'Shea and O'Leary walked the length of frozen Lake Baikal in Siberia – a 640 km trek, spending over 26 days on the ice.

Also in 2013, O'Shea crossed the Southern Kilimanjaro Icecap while guiding a number of groups up the mountain for Irish organisation Kilimanjaro Achievers following the death of Irish mountaineer Ian McKeever

In 2014, the team of O'Shea and O'Leary attempted to walk to the North Pole on an expedition dubbed the LifeProof Ice Project: this time the attempt was thwarted by injury to both adventurers.

=== Film ===
O'Shea is credited as Mountain Safety Team Leader for Star Wars: The Force Awakens, Safety Supervisor and Expedition Leader for Star Wars: The Last Jedi and Work At Height Supervisor for Mission: Impossible – Fallout
