= O'Shea =

Irish surname

- Pronunciation: /oʊˈʃeɪ/ oh-SHAY
- Language: English

Origin
- Language: Irish
- Region of origin: Ireland

O'Shea is a surname and, less often, a given name. It is an anglicized form of the Irish patronymic name Ó Séaghdha or Ó Sé, originating in the Kingdom of Corcu Duibne in County Kerry. Historian C. Thomas Cairney states that the O'Sheas were from the Corcu Duibne tribe, who were from the Erainn tribe, the second wave of Celts to settle in Ireland from about 500 to 100 BC (according to the now discredited model of T. F. O'Rahilly).

Notable people with the name include:

== Surname ==
- Alicia O'Shea Petersen (1862–1923), Australian suffragist
- Ashling O'Shea, British-Irish actress
- Barbara O'Shea, Australian politician
- Brian O'Shea (boxer), American boxer
- Brian O'Shea (politician) (1944–2026), Irish politician
- Clara O'Shea (1894–1970), American politician
- Clarrie O'Shea (1906–1988), Australian labour union secretary
- Conor O'Shea (born 1970), Irish Rugby player and coach
- Donal O'Shea, Canadian mathematician
- Franc O'Shea, Swazi musician
- Greg O'Shea, Australian record producer, audio engineer, mix engineer and musician
- Greg O'Shea (rugby union), Irish rugby union player
- Jack O'Shea (born 1957), All-Ireland winning Gaelic footballer from County Kerry
- James O'Shea and John O'Shea, Victorian stone carvers associated with John Ruskin
- Jay O'Shea (born 1988), Irish footballer
- John O'Shea (born 1981), Irish international footballer who has won the Premier League, the FA Cup and the UEFA Champions League
- John O'Shea (director) (1920–2001), New Zealand film director
- John O'Shea (humanitarian) (born 1944), Irish founder of GOAL, international humanitarian organization based in Ireland
- John Augustus O'Shea (1839–1905), Irish soldier, journalist, and writer
- Katharine O'Shea (1846–1921), English wife of Irish politician, Charles Stewart Parnell
- Kel O'Shea (1933–2015), Australian rugby league footballer
- Kevin O'Shea (basketball) (1925–2003), All-American college basketball player who later played professionally
- Lucius Trant O'Shea (1858–1920), British chemist and mining engineer
- Mark O'Shea (herpetologist) (born 1956), English herpetologist
- Mark O'Shea (musician) (born 16 February 1977), Australian singer-songwriter
- Michael O'Shea (actor) (1906–1973), American actor
- Mike O'Shea (Canadian football) (born 1970), Canadian football player

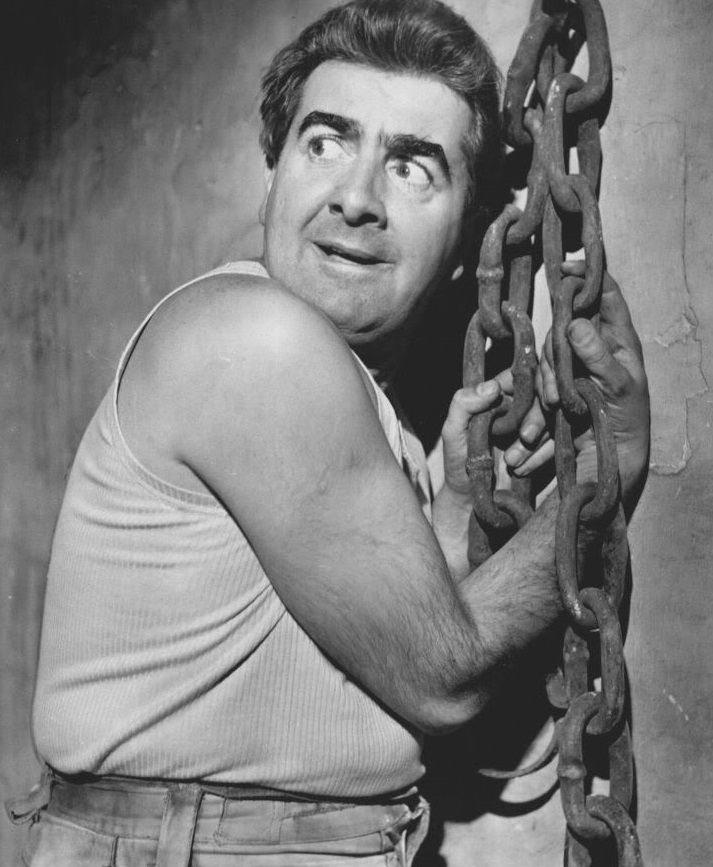
Actor Milo O'Shea

- Milo O'Shea (1926–2013), Irish actor
- Natalia O'Shea (born 1976), Russian linguist and musician
- Paloma O'Shea, 1st Marchioness of O'Shea (born 1936), Spanish pianist and aristocrat
- Rick O'Shea (born 1973), Irish radio DJ
- Seán O'Shea (born 1998), Irish Gaelic footballer
- Steve O'Shea, New Zealand marine biologist and environmentalist
- Tessie O'Shea (1913–1995), Welsh entertainer and actress
- Timothy O'Shea (born 1949), vice-chancellor and principal of the University of Edinburgh
- Tony O'Shea (born 1961), English darts player
- William O'Shea (1840–1905), Irish soldier and Member of Parliament

== Given name ==
- Oshae Brissett (born 1998), Canadian basketball player
- Ice Cube (born O'Shea Jackson in 1969), American rapper and actor
  - O'Shea Jackson Jr. (born 1991), his son, rapper and actor

== See also ==
- Irish clans
- O'Shea (band), an American-based Australian country music duo
- O'Shea and Whelan, an Irish family practice of stonemasons and sculptors
- Jack O'Shea's, meat retailer in Brussels and London
- Shea (disambiguation)
- Ó Sé – Irish language spelling of this name
