= William Shea (disambiguation) =

William Shea (1907–1991) was an American lawyer and baseball league founder.

William Shea may also refer to:

- William Shea (actor) (1856–1918), British actor
- William A. Shea (mayor), American politician
- William J. Shea (1900–1965), justice of the Connecticut Supreme Court
- William T. Shea (1930–2024), American politician

== See also ==
- William O'Shea (1840–1905), Irish soldier and Member of Parliament
- William O'Shea (boxer) (fl. 1920s), Irish Olympic boxer
- William Shay, namesake of the William Shay Double House in New Hamburg, New York
