= Paloma O'Shea =

Spanish pianist and patron of the arts

The Most Illustrious Paloma O'Shea
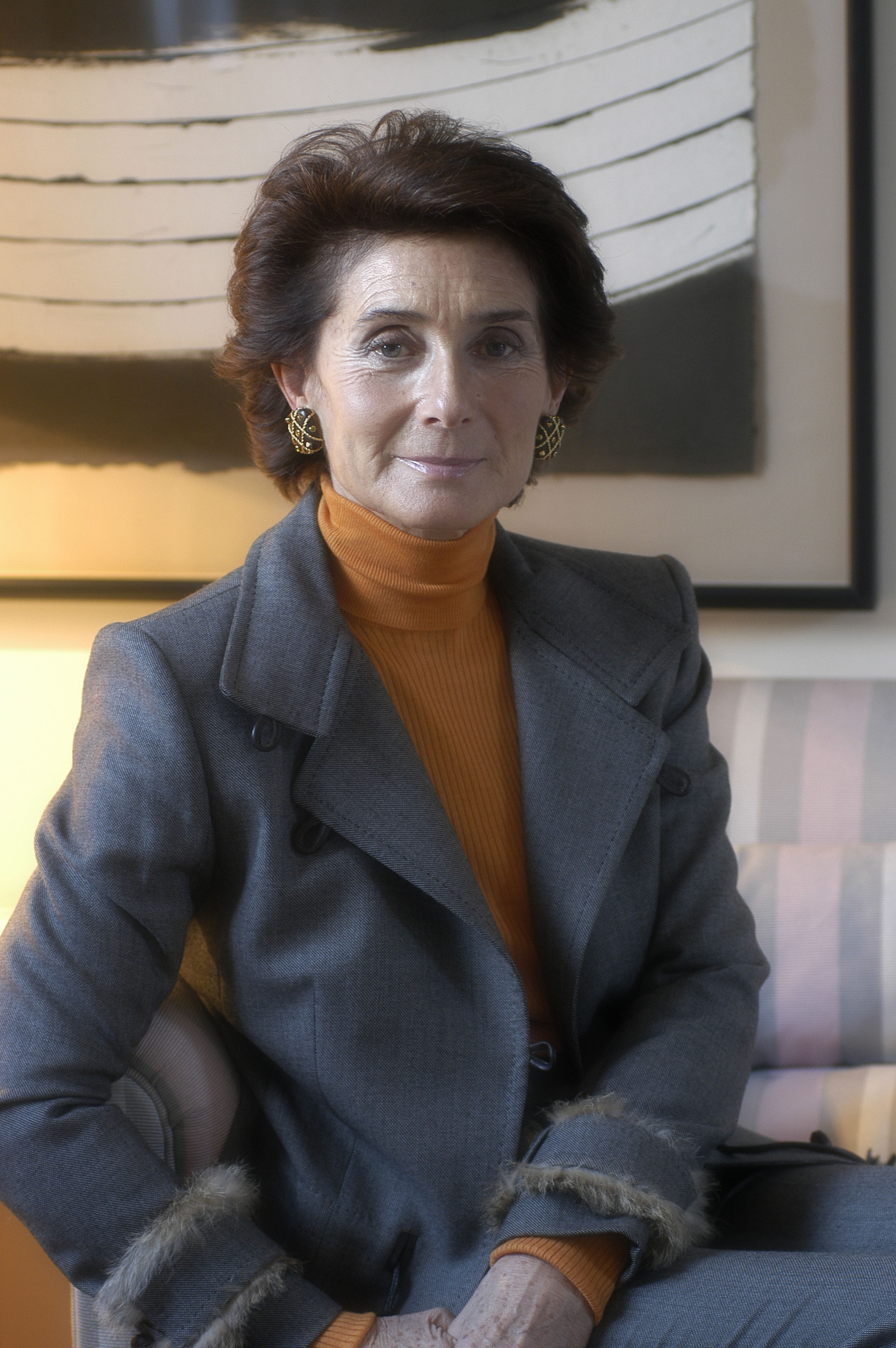
- Born: Paloma O'Shea y Artiñano; 19 February 1936 (age 90); Getxo, Spain
- Occupation: President of the Albéniz Foundation
- Spouse: Emilio Botín
- Children: 6, including Ana Patricia
- Parent(s): José O'Shea Sebastián; María Asunción Artiñano Luzárraga

Paloma O'Shea Artiñano, 1st Marchioness of O'Shea (born 19 February 1936) is a Spanish pianist, patron of the arts, founder and current president of the Reina Sofía School of Music, and founder and president of the Albéniz Foundation, which organizes the Paloma O'Shea Santander International Piano Competition in Santander, Spain.

Paloma O'Shea was born in the Bilbao suburb of Las Arenas, Biscay, Spain, a daughter of José O'Shea y Sebastián de Erice (descended from Irishman William O'Shea who came to Spain in the 18th century) and María de la Asunción de Artiñano y Luzarraga, married at Concepción, Madrid, on 2 May 1935. She started studying piano in 1941 in Bilbao and later moved to France to further her music studies. At the age of 15 she won the Primer Premio Fin de Carrera and performed as soloist with the Bilbao Symphony Orchestra. Several years later she married banker Emilio Botín, the previous Executive Chairman of Grupo Santander and devoted herself to promoting classical music in Spain.

In 1972 she founded the Concurso de Piano de Santander, which was later named after her and in 1991 founded the Reina Sofía School of Music, a private music school, now one of the leading music schools in Spain.

A very close friend to Queen Sofía, she was created Marchioness of O'Shea by King Juan Carlos I in 2008. She also hold the Légion d'honneur of France, the gold medal of the Spanish Institute in New York, and the Picasso Award of the UNESCO. She has six children and divides her time between Madrid and Santander.

== Professional career ==
Her professional activity has always been linked to the music world, its beginning having taken place in 1972 with the inception of the Paloma O'Shea Santander International Piano Competition. She has never stopped developing her initiatives ever since, through world-scale activities aimed at the modernization of musical life in Spain:

- 1972: Paloma O'Shea Santander International Piano Competition
- 1987: Albéniz Foundation
- 1989: Isaac Albéniz Library and Research Centre
- 1991: Reina Sofía School of Music
- 1998: Yehudi Menuhin Prize to the Integration of the Arts and the Education
- 2000: MagisterMusicae.com, which provides online music education
- 2001: Encounter of Santander "Music and Academia"
- 2005: International Chamber Music Institute of Madrid
- 2010: Classicalplanet.com

== Albéniz Foundation ==
The Albéniz Foundation is the cultural institution that has been managing and coordinating these programs since its founding in 1987 and the instrument that has allowed Paloma O'Shea to reunite private and public efforts altogether in a common project of community service. The impact and importance of these activities has been recognized many times by Spanish and international institutions. This recognition took place for the first time with the Ribbon of the Order of Queen Isabella I of Castile. In 1988, she received the Medal of Honor of the San Fernando Royal Academy of Fine Arts and in 1994 the Picasso Medal of the UNESCO to her contribution to the cultural understanding between countries and to her dedication to the promotion of young artists. She has also received the Heraldic Order of Christopher Columbus, of the Dominican Republic, the Golden Medal of the Spanish Institute of New York and in 1996 the Montblanc Prize of Culture. In 1998, because of an agreement of the Counsel of Ministers, Paloma O'Shea received from the hands of Their Majesty the Kings of Spain the Golden Medal to the Merit in Fine Arts. She has also been nominated by the Regional Government of Cantabria "Adoptive Daughter", in 2004 she was nominated Chevalier de la Légion d'Honneur by the French government and in 2005 she was bestowed the Culture Prize of the Community of Madrid. A year later she was awarded with the Honor Medal of the Manuel de Falla Archive, "Adoptive Daughter" of Santander and Honorary Fellow title of the Royal Academy of Music in London. In 2009, the Madrid city council bestowed her its Golden Medal.

== Paloma O'Shea Santander International Piano Competition ==
Paloma O'Shea's "Foundations", in the words of Enrique Franco, had started in 1972 with the Santander Piano Competition, that very soon recollected international fame and relevance, as it is demonstrated by its entering in 1976 in the International Competitions Federation, based in Geneva. Today, after almost forty years of existence, this prize is a coveted one, to which opt the most talented young pianists. It was precisely the development of the Competition what woke in Paloma O'Shea the idea of an improvement of the musical training in Spain. Spanish pianists had problems to get to the final phases of the Competition and the reason was not their talent, but the few opportunities they had to reach a higher level of education. That was the inception of the piano masterclasses offered in Santander by important soloists and pedagogues, in partnership with Menéndez Pelayo International University. This isolated series of lessons gave place to a regular and broader call for Summer Courses, celebrated each year in Santander and including instruments other than piano.

== Santander Encounter "Music and Academia" ==
This teaching progression in Santander had its climax in July 2001 with the foundation of the Santander Encounter "Music and Academy". Each month of July the Encounter encourages the coexistence of important maestri and young musicians coming from the best European Schools. It also mixes classrooms and stages, filling Santander and Cantabria with music with 60 public concerts and more than 500 hours of masterclasses.

== Reina Sofía School of Music ==
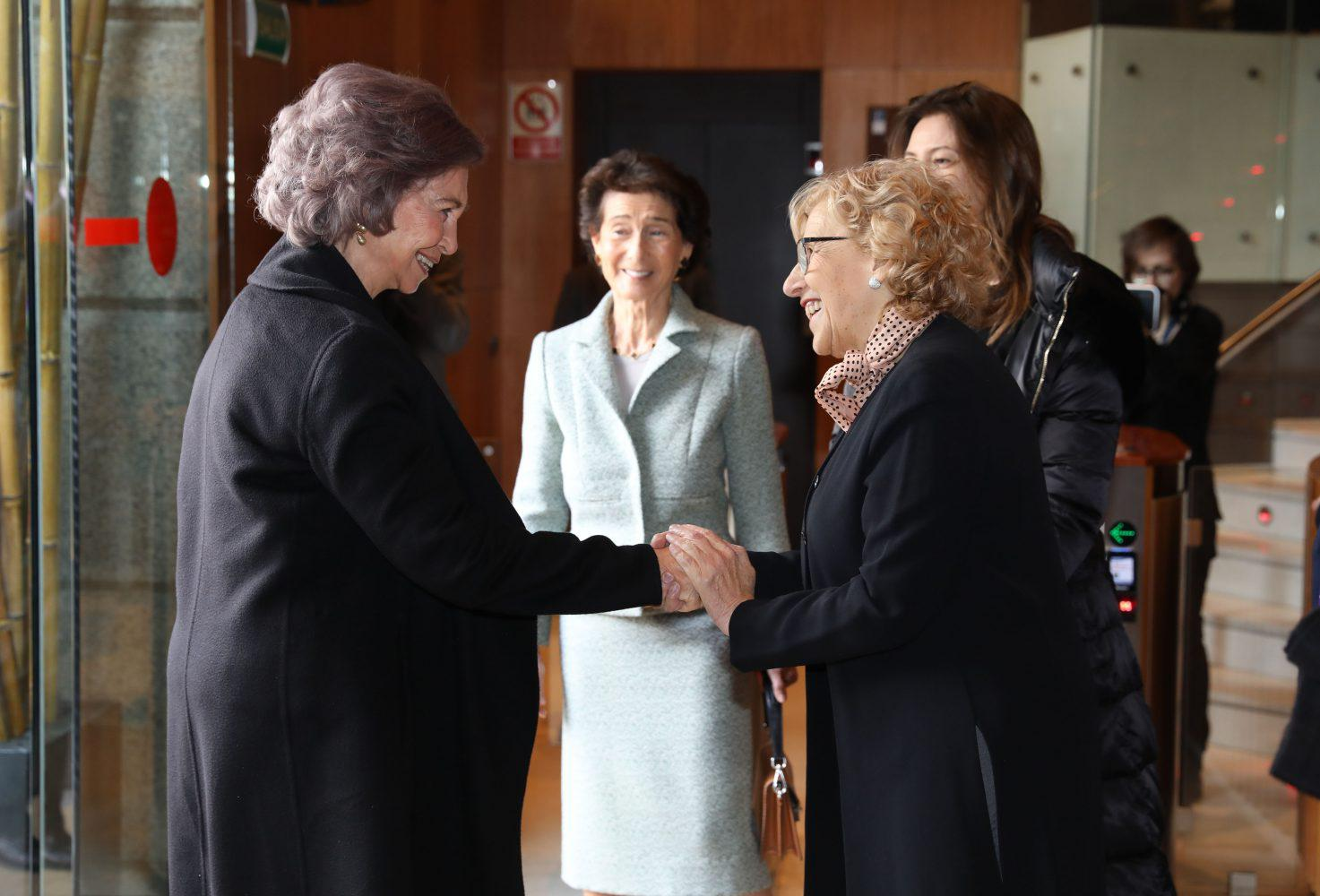
Paloma O'Shea, Queen Sofía and the mayor of Madrid, Manuela Carmena attend a meeting of the Board of Trustees of the School.

After the experience gained at the Competition, Paloma O'Shea aimed to create a permanent center in Spain - with the support of prominent artistic personalities including Alicia de Larrocha, Zubin Mehta, Lorin Maazel, Yehudi Menuhin and Mstislav Rostropovich. Her Majesty the Queen Sofía gave support to the project, fulfilling the role of Honorary President. After twenty years of temporary location in Pozuelo de Alarcón, the School was transferred in autumn 2009 to its new location, designed by the architect Miguel Oriol and built by the Albéniz Foundation. It is an emblematic building, located in the Plaza de Oriente in Madrid, next to the Royal Palace and Royal Theater. The Sony Auditorium offers digital audio, communication, lighting and video systems for productions. With acoustics designed by Vicente Mestre and an organ built by Gerhard Grenzing, the auditorium features chamber music, hosting approximately 150 shows a year, and seats 351 people.

The Reina Sofía Music School works with international partners to exchange music traditions, such as in initiatives The Encounter, with virtual music school Magister Musicae, the Harmos Project, and the Yehudi Menuhin Prize.

Spanish nobility
New title	Marchioness of O'Shea; 2008–present	Incumbent
