= Shays =

Shays may refer to:

- Daniel Shays (c. 1747 – 1825), post-colonial leader of Shays' Rebellion
- Chris Shays (born 1945), American politician and former United States Congressman from Connecticut
- Rosalind Shays, a fictional attorney in several seasons of L.A. Law, portrayed by Diana Muldaur

== See also ==
- Shay (disambiguation)
