= William Shay Double House =

Historic house in New York, United States

- U.S. National Register of Historic Places
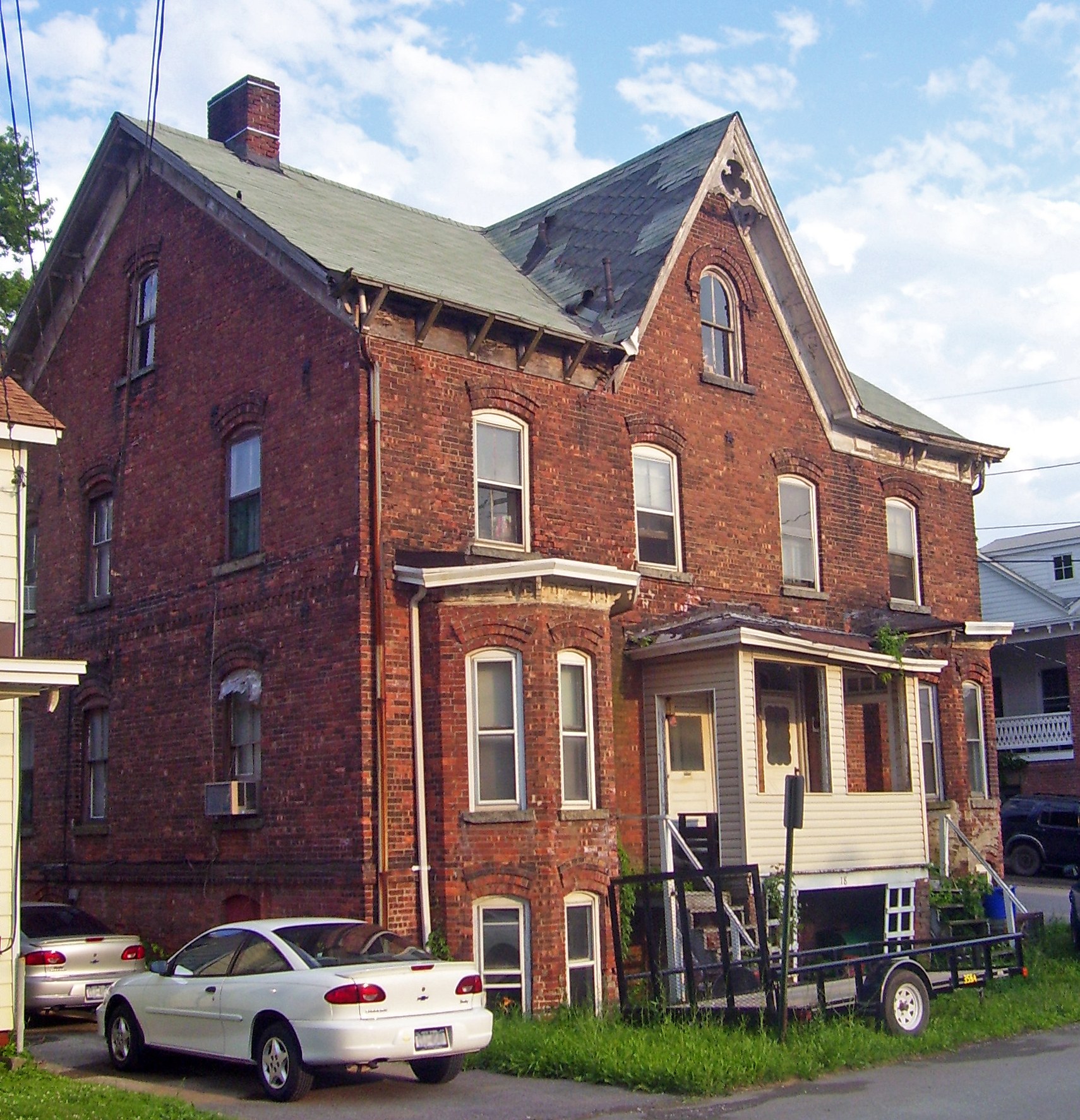
- Front (west) elevation and north profile, 2008
- Location: New Hamburg. NY
- Nearest city: Poughkeepsie
- Coordinates: 41°35′13″N 73°56′59″W
- Built: ca. 1870
- Architectural style: Gothic Revival
- MPS: New Hamburg MRA
- NRHP reference No.: 87000121
- Added to NRHP: 1982

The William Shay Double House is a residential duplex at Point Street and River Road in New Hamburg, New York, United States. It was built around 1870 and added to the National Register of Historic Places in 1982.

Shay, a local rag and cotton merchant, lived nearby and worked out of an adjacent warehouse. The duplex is a brick building in the Gothic Revival architectural style, unusual for both its scale and amount of decoration for utilitarian worker housing of the period in the area. It is still in use as a rental property.

== Building ==
The house is a two-story brick building with raised basement. Its gable roof, pierced by two chimneys, is surfaced in asphalt shingles. A steeply-pitched cross-gable runs from east to west; on both elevations it has trefoil detail in the peak and a single rounded-arch window with corbeled stops. The roofline has a wooden cornice decorated with paired brackets and acorn pendants flanking frame panels all around. Star anchor bolts are in the brick all over, and a string course is laid between the lower stories.

On the west elevation is a raised vestibule porch. The double doors are flanked by paired brackets and a brick transom. It is flanked by two one-and-a-half-story brick bays with narrow windows. The rear has a more modern shed-roofed porch.

There are two other buildings on the lot. Shay's Warehouse and Stable is separately listed on the Register and was built prior to the house. A frame one-story flat-roofed clapboard-sided garage was built in the 20th century.

== Aesthetics ==
Duplexes built on a mirror plan were not unusual in the area at the time; there are some in nearby Wappingers Falls, where they were built mainly to house workers in the village's industries, which included some of the earliest cotton textile mills in New York. It is likely that Shay's business as a ragman took him there, where he would have seen them and decided to undertake a similar project in New Hamburg.

The duplex he built, however, was on a larger scale than similar houses in any nearby community. It also included many ornamental touches, both inside and out, not seen on such houses, showing in some areas a sophistication normally seen on houses of the well-to-do in the region, reaching a Picturesque level. The alternation of panels and paired brackets in the roof, for instance, is identical to one shown in Villas and Cottages, an 1857 pattern book by Calvert Vaux.

== See also ==
- National Register of Historic Places listings in Dutchess County, New York
