= Marquess of Borghetto =

Title ib the Peerage of Spain

Marquessate of Borghetto
- Creation date: 1765
- Created by: Philip, Duke of Parma
- Peerage: Peerage of Spain
- First holder: Catalina de Bassecourt y Thieulaine, 1st Marchioness of Borghetto
- Present holder: Carlos Morenés y Mariátegui, 10th Marquess of Borghetto

Marquess of Borghetto (Spanish: Marqués de Borghetto) is a hereditary title in the peerage of Spain, granted originally in the peerage of Parma to Catalina de Bassecourt, by Philip, Duke of Parma, member of the Spanish royal family and younger brother of Charles III of Spain, on July 1765.

Catalina de Bassecourt was the honorary lady-in-waiting of Elisabeth Farnese, Queen of Spain as wife of Philip V and mother of the Duke of Parma, and later of María Luisa of Parma.

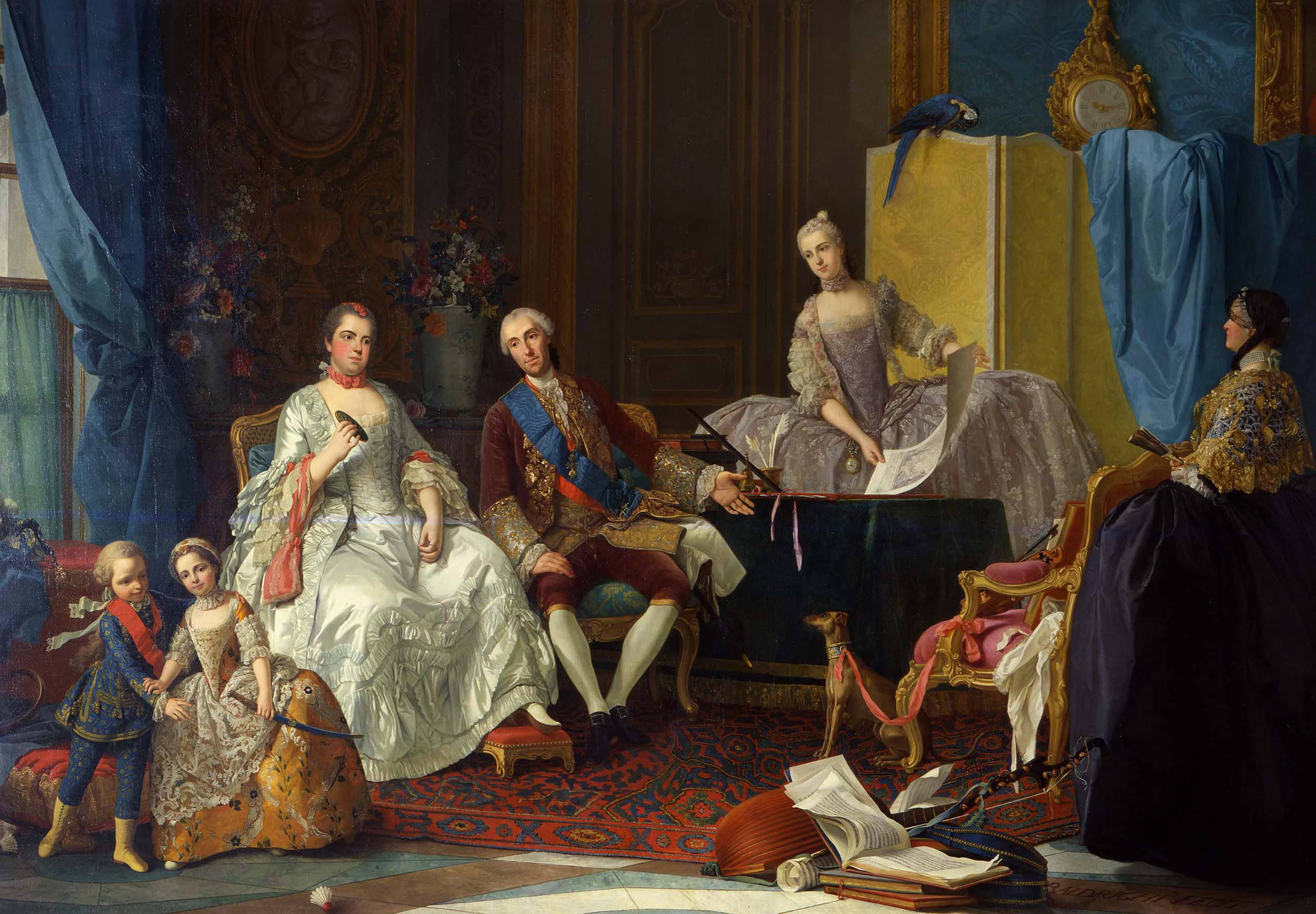
The family of Philip I of Parma by Giuseppe Baldrighi. To the right, the 1st Marchioness of Borghetto, 1757

In 1903, Alfonso XIII recognised it as a title of the Kingdom and peerage of Spain, issuing a Royal Decree in favour of Felipe Morenés y García-Alessón, in memory of his ancestors' parmesan title.

== Marquesses of Borghetto (1765) ==
- Catalina de Bassecourt y Thieulaine, 1st Marchioness of Borghetto
- Francisco González de Bassecourt, 2nd Marquess of Borghetto
- Felipe María Pinel y González Ladrón de Guevara y Bassecourt, 3rd Marquess of Borghetto
- Antonio María Pinel y Ceballos, 4th Marquess of Borghetto
- María de la Concepción Pinel y Ceballos, 5th Marchioness of Borghetto
- Carlos García-Alessón y Pinel de Monroy, 6th Marquess of Borghetto
- María Fernanda García-Alessón y Pardo de Rivadeneyra, 7th Marchioness of Borghetto
- Felipe Morenés y García-Alessón, 8th Marquess of Borghetto
- Felipe Morenés y Medina, 9th Marquess of Borghetto
- Carlos Morenés y Mariátegui, 10th Marquess of Borghetto

== See also ==
- Philip, Duke of Parma
