= Shy (company) =

Italian fashion company

SHY
- Company type: Società a Responsabilità Limita (Limited company)
- Industry: Consumer Goods
- Founded: 2001
- Headquarters: Venice, Italy
- Key people: Paolo Tommasin, Designer; Tiziano Tommasin, Designer
- Products: Women's shoes, handbags
- Website: www.shycollection.com

SHY is an Italian owned fashion label specialising in women's shoes and handbags. It was founded in Riviera del Brenta, Venice in 2001. SHY are considered high fashion and have very few stores, all of which are within Europe. SHY gained much attention in the fashion world by being featured in Vogue magazine in March, 2005.

== Stores ==
SHY have one flagship store, in Crocus City Mall, Moscow. The main showroom is on the commercial road of Via Marcona in Milan. Outside Italy, SHY shoes can be found in high end fashion stores such as Maryon's in Australia, Tracey Ross in the USA, Joyce in Hong Kong and La Scarpa in Istanbul. They often have a stand at upmarket shoe events such as the Micam Shoe-event in Milan in 2006, also having season long exhibitions at cities such as Paris and Milan.

== Collections ==
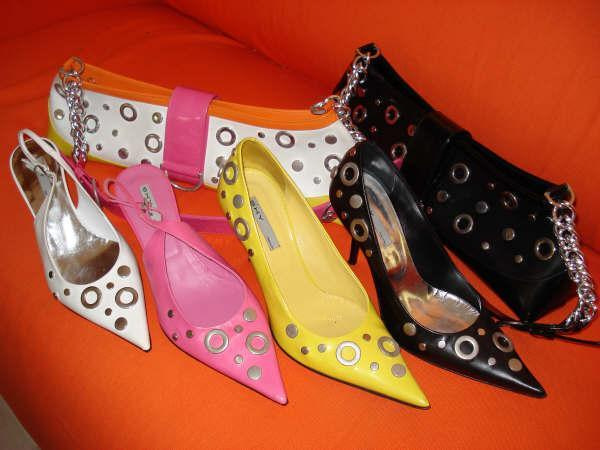
A set of SHY shoes and handbags from the Spring/Summer 2004 collection.

SHY release a new themed collection twice a year, one for spring/summer and one for fall/winter. The collections often revolve around a central theme such as bright colours or metal, and the collection usually contains different styles of shoe such as stilettos, sandals, boots and usually have a similarly styled handbag. In each collection, there are different themed sets, each one consisting of 6-8 different shoes and 2-3 handbags. At the SHY store and high end retailers, the shoes retail at over €400 (£270) and the handbags retail at over €500 (£340).

== See also ==
- List of Italian companies
