= Shal (disambiguation) =

Shal is a city in Qazvin Province, Iran.

Shal (Persian: شال) may also refer to:

- Shal, Ardabil
- Shal Rural District, Ardabil province
- Shal Brick Company, Qazvin province
- Shal District, in Qazvin province
