= Katriona Shea =

British-American ecologist

- Education: University of Oxford (BA); Imperial College London (PhD)
- Scientific career
- Fields: Ecology
- Workplaces: CSIRO; Pennsylvania State University; University of California, Santa Cruz; University of California, Santa Barbara
- Thesis: Matrix Models in Population Ecology (1994)
- Doctoral advisor: Michael Hassell
- Website: bio.psu.edu/directory/kus3

Katriona Shea is a British-American ecologist. She is the endowed Alumni Chair of Biology Science at Eberly College of Science, Pennsylvania State University.

== Education ==
Shea studied physics at New College, Oxford, and graduated in 1990. She joined Imperial College London where she completed a Natural Environment Research Council sponsored PhD in population ecology. Her thesis, Matrix Models in Population Ecology, was supervised by Michael Hassell.

== Research and career ==
After completing her PhD, Shea joined University of California, Santa Barbara as a postdoctoral researcher working with Robert Nisbet and Bill Murdoch. In 1996 she joined the CSIRO Cooperative Research Centre for Weed Management. She was invited to work at the Australian National University between 1996 and 1997. In 1999 she returned to California, working at University of California, Santa Cruz with Marc Mangel. She explored decision theory in conservation biology.

In 2001 Shea was appointed Assistant Professor at Pennsylvania State University. She became a professor in 2011. Her research uses ecological theory in population management. She helps conservation efforts as well as the control of invasive diseases and pests. She has worked in rainforests in Guyana and the Serengeti National Park.

Shea uses a range of empirical and quantitative methods to study ecology of outbreaking species. She worked with Matthew Ferrari on adaptive management to combine scientific understanding with policy development. She has studied the way to manage populations during the Ebola outbreaks. They used adaptive management to retrospectively study measles outbreaks. She demonstrated that speedy interventions by policymakers can limit the health and cost impact of outbreaks. In 2016 she was elected a fellow of the Ecological Society of America. Shea has contributed to The Conversation and Science.

=== Awards and honors ===
- 2018 Named Fellow of the American Association for the Advancement of Science (AAAS)
- 2011 Pennsylvania State University Dean's Climate and Diversity Award
- 2004 Pennsylvania State University Edward D. Bellis Award
