= OtterBox =

American consumer electronics accessory company

Otter Products, LLC
- Type: Private
- Founded: 1998; 28 years ago in Fort Collins, Colorado, United States
- Founders: Curt Richardson; David Bridge
- Headquarters: Fort Collins, Colorado, United States
- Area served: Worldwide
- Key people: JC Richardson (Chairman); Trey Northrup (CEO); Gerald Chen (CFO)
- Products: Mobile phone accessories iPad accessories Apple Watch accessories Xbox accessories
- Brands: Zens
- Revenue: ▲US$923.6 million
- Number of employees: c. 766
- Website: otterbox.com

Otter Products, LLC, doing business as OtterBox, is an American privately owned consumer electronics accessory company based in Fort Collins, Colorado, that produces cases for mobile devices. The company was founded in 1998 as a manufacturer of water-resistant boxes meant to house electronic devices, mostly catering to outdoor enthusiasts. Since then, OtterBox has produced both water-resistant and non-water-resistant protective phone cases for smartphones.

== History ==
In 1991, Curt Richardson made the first “OtterBox,” a water-resistant box, in his garage after he noticed an increase in the popularity of water sports. After settling on the design of the Otterbox, Richardson started the company in 1998. He was strongly influenced by the 1986 book about business theories, E-Myth, by Michael Gerber.

In 2001, the company began to produce iPod cases, which were introduced in 2004. OtterBox ceased the production of iPod cases in 2010 to focus on mobile devices. As of 2012, the company provides military-grade accessories for protecting battlefield military technology.

In July 2012, Curt Richardson announced he would be stepping down as CEO and taking up the position of chairman. He was replaced by Brian Thomas.

In November 2014, the company announced the departure of CEO Brian Thomas. The company appointed the company's president, Peter Lindgren, to the role of CEO to replace Thomas, who served until March 2016. In early 2016, Jim Parke, the CEO of Blue Ocean Enterprises, Inc, was appointed as the CEO of Otter Products, LLC.

As of December 2022, JC Richardson, son of founders Curt and Nancy, took over the role of CEO of Otter Products. He took over the role, having previously sat on the board. In August 2024, Richardson announced that Trey Northrup, formerly of Lixil Group and Whirlpool Corporation, had been hired as CEO, with Richardson moving to the role of board chairman.

== Spin-offs ==
Three start-up businesses grew from OtterBox: Nerdy Minds, Wild Rock, and 1OAK Technologies. All three founders of these businesses worked at OtterBox and are now backed by the company. On May 22, 2013, OtterBox acquired the San Diego–based smartphone and tablet case manufacturer LifeProof.

== Products ==
As of April 2026, OtterBox provides cases for products by Apple, Google (Pixel), Motorola, Nokia, OnePlus, and Samsung. The company has produced eleven different lines of cases while four lines are no longer in production. The company also manufactures screen protectors under its "Clearly Protected" line.

In May 2017, OtterBox announced a new product line, a line of coolers and tumblers called "Venture Coolers".

In January 2019, OtterBox announced a partnership with Corning to create a new line of screen protectors named "Amplify" for iPhone, Galaxy, and other mobile phones.

In 2020, OtterBox launched power banks, charging kits, and cables that work with both Apple and Android products.

In 2021, OtterBox branched into gaming accessories with mobile game clips and carrying cases for Xbox controllers and iPhones.

In 2022, OtterBox launched a program called the "OtterBox Protection Program" for all new cases.
