= Siyabulela Shai =

South African soccer player

Personal information
- Full name: Siyabulela Mbali Shai
- Date of birth: 18 March 1993 (age 33)
- Position: Midfielder

Team information
- Current team: Marumo Gallants
- Number: 27

Youth career
- Mamelodi Sundowns

Senior career*
Years	Team	Apps	(Gls)
2011–2016	Mamelodi Sundowns	0	(0)
2012–2013	→ United FC (loan)	24	(3)
2013–2015	→ Chippa United (loan)	42	(3)
2015–2016	→ Maritzburg United (loan)	5	(0)
2017	EC Bees		
2017–2018	Black Leopards	4	(0)
2018–2019	Tshakhuma Tsha Madzivhandila	4	(0)
2019–2020	VOS Milan		
2020–2023	Sekhukhune United	46	(4)
2023–2024	Platinum City Rovers	15	(1)
2024–	Marumo Gallants	6	(0)
- * Club domestic league appearances and goals as of 18 November 2024

Siyabulela Mbali Shai (born 18 March 1993) is a South African soccer player who plays as a midfielder for Marumo Gallants in the South African Premier Division.

He hails from Wattville and is a son of Mamelodi Sundowns player Isaac Shai. Siyabulela Shai too was given a chance at Mamelodi Sundowns, but was loaned out to several clubs. He got his Premier Soccer League debut on loan at Chippa United in 2014. In 2015–16 he was on loan at Maritzburg United, but was recalled to Sundowns in January 2016.

He departed from the Sundowns due to not getting playing time. He surfaced at the club EC Bees in 2017. The team contested the SAFA Second Division, but was in the round of 32 of the 2016–17 Nedbank Cup.

Shai stayed in the second tier with Black Leopards and Tshakhuma Tsha Madzivhandila without playing regularly. In 2019–20 he played for VOS Milan in the Regional League, which was also hampered by the pandemic. A move to All Stars was also put on hold, but in late 2020 he was finally able to restart his career in Sekhukhune United. The club was promoted to the 2021–22 South African Premier Division, which marked Shai's return to the first tier after a several-year absence. He did not play often in 2021–22, however, and was accused of "off-the-field antics". He got more playing time in the 2022–23 season, but afterwards left for Platinum City Rovers. In 2024 he returned to the first tier, signing for Marumo Gallants.
