= Emilio Botín (1903–1993) =

Spanish banker (1903–1993)

Emilio Botín-Sanz de Sautuola López (18 January 1903 – 22 September 1993) was a Spanish banker, the chairman of Santander Group from 1950 to 1986.

He was born in 1903, the son of Emilio Botín López and María Sanz de Sautuola y Escalante.

He was chairman of Santander from 1950 to 1986.

He was married to Ana García de los Ríos y Caller.

He was the father of Emilio Botín and Jaime Botín.
