= Shay's Warehouse and Stable =

Historic commercial building in New York, United States

- U.S. National Register of Historic Places
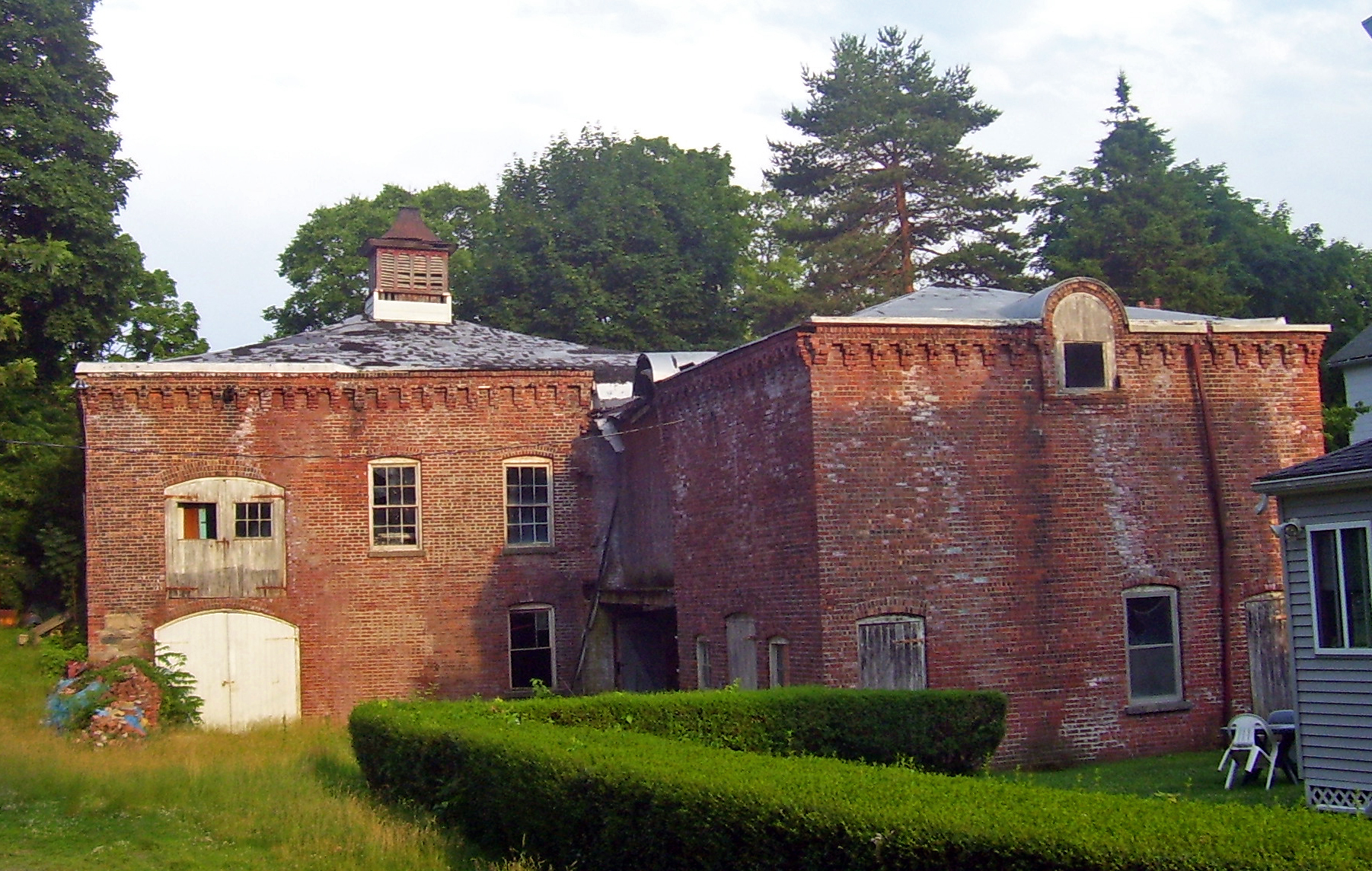
- Warehouse and Stable in 2008
- Location: New Hamburg, New York, US
- Nearest city: Poughkeepsie, New York, US
- Coordinates: 41°35′14″N 73°56′58″W
- Built: ca. 1870
- Architectural style: Italianate
- MPS: New Hamburg MRA
- NRHP reference No.: 87000123
- Added to NRHP: February 27, 1987

== Building ==
The building consists of two connected two-story sections: a square warehouse and rectangular stable. They are built into a slight slope and only the west (main) elevation is fully exposed. It has a stone foundation giving way to brick laid in common bond rising to a low-pitched tin hipped roof with an unusual brick-corbeled cornice and a few arched dormer windows.

Inside, both sections are almost intact. The warehouse's floors are both open, with its upper floor supported by randomly spaced joists supported by heavy beams at the center. In the stable, the tack room and stalls have been removed to make space for contemporary automotive uses but other than that there have been no changes.

There are no outbuildings related to its original use surviving. Shay's house is also on the parcel, but it has undergone considerable change since it was built and is not considered contributing.

== History ==
Shay bought the Main Street-Point Street corner property around 1863. His house is shown on maps of the village from the next decade, but not the warehouse. It probably existed as it was not the custom of mapmakers of the time to show outbuildings. He used it for storage and transshipment of rags and cotton waste from the mills in Wappingers Falls.

In later years it would see other uses as New Hamburg changed due to the decline in commercial traffic along the Hudson River and the later rise and fall of the railroad over the 20th century. It would be a cooperage for apple barrels and a brass foundry. The stable was modified as cars replaced horses. At the time of its listing on the National Register it was a boat-repair shop, reflecting the nearby marinas that now dominate the hamlet's economy.

More recently it has been used just for storage. It is today the only intact surviving commercial or industrial building from New Hamburg's days as a river port.

== Aesthetics ==
Like the nearby duplex Shay built, the warehouse (stable) is very ornamented for a vernacular industrial or related building from that period in the Poughkeepsie area. Unlike the duplex, built five years later, its basic style is Italianate, as evidenced by the blocky forms and arched windows. But the decoration, particularly the corbeled brick, suggests an attempt to interpret the Picturesque mode popularized in mid-century.
