= Kevin Shea =

Kevin Shea may refer to:

- Kevin Shea (administrator), who served as the acting U.S. Secretary of Agriculture in 2021
- Kevin Shea (jockey) (born 1963), former South African horse racing jockey
- Kevin Shea (musician) (born 1973), American jazz drummer in improvisation and experimental music
