= Isaac Shai =

South African soccer player

Personal information
- Date of birth: 26 February 1971 (age 55)
- Place of birth: Boksburg, Gauteng, South Africa
- Position: Midfielder

Senior career*
Years	Team	Apps	(Gls)
1992–2004	Mamelodi Sundowns	315	(46)

International career
1997–2002	South Africa	7	(0)
- * Club domestic league appearances and goals

Isaac Shai (born 26 February 1971) is a South African former soccer player who played at both professional and international levels as a midfielder. Shai played club football for Mamelodi Sundowns; he also earned seven caps for the South African national side between 1997 and 2002.

== Personal life ==
His son Siyabulela Shai became a soccer player as well.

== See also ==
- List of one-club men in association football
