= LifeProof =

Consumer electronics accessory company

- Type: Subsidiary
- Industry: Computer hardware; Mobile Device Accessories
- Founded: 2009
- Founder: Gary Rayner
- Headquarters: San Diego County, California, U.S.
- Area served: Worldwide
- Parent: OtterBox
- Website: LifeProof.com

LifeProof is a U.S. consumer electronics accessory company headquartered in San Diego, California, and was acquired in 2013 by OtterBox. The company designs, manufactures, and markets cases that protect the functionality and condition of smartphones and tablets from water, snow, dirt, and shock. Their products include cases, flotation jacketing, belt clips, headphones, chargers, connectors, arm bands, bike mounts, and photography equipment.

== History ==
LifeProof was founded in 2009 by Gary Rayner. He is a serial entrepreneur and has an MBA in Business from Queensland University of Technology. After 18 months and a $1 million investment, the company made its public debut at the 2011 LAUNCH Conference where it won awards for the best product and best presentation after a demonstration with a LifeProof-protected iPhone 4 that included dropping it on the ground, smothering it in ketchup, mustard, and dirt, followed by successfully rinsing it off in a fish tank.

In August 2011, rival manufacturer Otterbox filed a patent suit claiming the company infringed on four properties of protective device enclosures. On October 10, 2012, Ironman announced LifeProof as an official sponsor during the Ironman World Championship in Kona, Hawaii. Announced November 27, 2012, LifeProof became a Participating Sponsor of all 2013 XTERRA Triathlon events, marketing, and media in the United States. On January 7, 2013, LifeProof announced a partnership with Belkin EMEA. Belkin EMEA will be responsible for the sales and distribution of LifeProof products in Europe.

On May 23, 2013, when the company was acquired by Otterbox for an undisclosed amount, the Colorado court officially terminated the patent suit case.

== Technology ==
LifeProof combines many technologies to create a case that protects electronic devices from the inside out. The case makes the phone resistant to water, dirt, snow, and shock. The case combines a polycarbonate frame, waterproof acoustic ports, a waterproof screen protector that is still touch-sensitive, and a built-in optical glass that covers the phone's camera lenses to prevent loss of photographic detail.

To waterproof the earphone jack, LifeProof created a screw-in seal that can be used when the jack is not in use. To use the jack and still maintain the waterproof function, LifeProof provides a short waterproof earphone extension wire that screws into the jack on the case. When used with waterproof earphones, this allows a swimmer to listen to music while fully underwater, provided that the swimmer remains near the surface. For deeper submersion or vigorous surfing, a dive case with a higher rating is useful. Optional "Lifejacket Float" flotation jacketing can be added to some models to prevent the equipment from sinking if dropped into water.

LifeProof claims that it conducts water-resistance tests on every case before shipping. Following the first test, LifeProof will send the case to an independent agent to perform additional tests.
