= Shay Motors Corporation =

Automobile company

- Industry: Automotive Manufacturing
- Predecessor: Model A & Model T Motor Car Reproduction Corporation
- Founded: February 1978 in Wixom, Michigan, United States
- Founder: Harry J. Shay
- Defunct: March 29, 1982
- Successor: Camelot Motors, Inc.
- Headquarters: Wixom, Michigan

Shay Motors Corporation was an automobile company founded by Harry J. Shay in February 1978 as the Model A & Model T Motor Car Reproduction Corporation. Harry Shay arranged with Ford Motor Company to build a limited run, modern-day reproduction of the Ford Model A Roadster, with a rumble seat, that was to be sold through the network of Ford Automobile Dealers and built in Battle Creek, Michigan. It was hoped that displaying the vehicles in Ford dealer showrooms would increase potential customer visits and sales.

== History ==
=== Design ===
While having the outward appearance of the classic automobile, the reproduction was built with a fiberglass body and used a modern frame and powertrain. The Model A used the same 2.3L 4 cylinder engine as a Ford Pinto with the option of a Ford C4 automatic transmission or a four-speed manual transmission. Five different body styles were offered including a left hand spare tire mount behind the front fender, a dual spare mount behind each front fender, a spare tire mount on the rear of the vehicle, a pickup truck version, and a Model A C cab/panel truck. Harry Shay was quoted at the time that the vehicle was “an illusion of a Model A” and only the appearance would be authentic. A number of design patents were applied for and awarded involving components for the vehicles that Shay Motors built. The vehicles were offered with a 12 month 12,000 mile warranty. Keeping the production numbers under 10,000 units would exempt Shay Motors from having to incorporate modern Federal regulations into the reproductions. The production of a 1955 Thunderbird was also started in 1980 with different models planned as the company grew.

=== Closure ===
Shay Motors was unable to keep up with the orders received and experienced problems with some of the early Model A's produced. The production method used was to have a team of four people completely assemble each vehicle instead of using a traditional assembly line. In 1982 Shay Motors was struggling with cash flow problems as well as high interest payments on loans along with a number of lawsuits. The company ceased production in mid-March 1982 and, despite trying to reorganize through bankruptcy, the company's assets were sold to Camelot Motors, Inc., in April 1983. Final production numbers for the Shay Motor Corporation Model A were 5,000 units along with 200 units of the Thunderbird reproductions during its time in business. Harry Shay continued to work in the auto industry until 1990; he died in 1995 at age 70.
