= Francis Shea =

Francis Shea may refer to:

- Francis Raymond Shea (1913–1994), Roman Catholic Bishop of Evansville, Indiana, 1969–1989
- Francis X. Shea (1926–1977), American Jesuit priest and educator
- Francis M. Shea, American lawyer, law professor and United States government official
