= Marquess of O'Shea =

Hereditary title in Spanish nobility

Marquessate of O'Shea
- Creation date: 11 July 2008
- Created by: Juan Carlos I
- Peerage: Peerage of Spain
- First holder: Paloma O'Shea Artiñano
- Present holder: Paloma O'Shea Artiñano
- Heir apparent: Ana Botín

Marquess of O'Shea is a hereditary title in the Spanish nobility, created by King Juan Carlos I on 11 July 2008 in favor of Paloma O'Shea. It was granted in recognition of her vast contribution to music and patronage in Spain.

The Marchioness of O'Shea was married to the late Emilio Botín, Executive Chairman of Banco Santander, and is the mother of Ana Botín, who succeeded him in 2014, becoming the 9th most powerful woman in the world, according to Forbes.

== Creation ==
On 11 July 2008, the Monarch signed Royal Decree 1176/2008, of 11 July, that stated:

The generous contribution of Ms. Paloma O'Shea Artiñano to the promotion of musical culture in Spain, through the implementation of brilliant patronage initiatives, deserves to be distinguished in a special way, therefore, wanting to show her my Royal appreciation,
I grant her the title of Marchioness of O'Shea, for her and her successors, in accordance with Spanish nobility law.

— JUAN CARLOS R., Royal Decree n.º 1176 of 11 July 2008.

== Marquesses of O'Shea ==
1. Paloma O'Shea, 1st Marchioness of O'Shea (2008–present)

== See also ==
- Spanish nobility
