= Joseph Shea =

Joseph Shea may refer to:

- Joseph Francis Shea (1925–1999), NASA manager and aerospace engineer
- Joe Shea (1947–2016), editor-in-chief of The American Reporter
- Joseph Shea (FBI agent) (1919–2005), FBI agent
- Joseph Hooker Shea (1863–1928), U.S. ambassador to Chile
- Joseph Shea (Jesuit) (1829–1881), Jesuit priest and president of St. John's College (now Fordham University)
- Joseph H. Shea, American soldier and Medal of Honor recipient

== See also ==
- John Joseph Shea, officer in the United States Navy
