= Gerald Shea (district attorney) =

American attorney

Gerald Shea is an American attorney who served as District Attorney for San Luis Obispo County, California from 1998 to 2013.

Born in the San Diego County, California, area, Shea received his BA in English from San Diego State University in 1971. He received his J.D. degree from Loyola Law School in Los Angeles in 1974. For the next three years, Shea worked for the California Attorney General's Office in Los Angeles as Deputy Attorney General.

In 1977, Shea became the Deputy District Attorney for San Luis Obispo County . On June 2, 1998. Shea was elected District Attorney. He replaced Barry LaBarbera. Shea ran unopposed for re-election in 2002 and 2006.

On November 18, 2013, Shea announced that he would not seek reelection to a fifth term.
