= Jaime Botín =

Spanish banker (1936–2024)

- Born: 10 April 1936 (age 90); Santander, Cantabria, Spain
- Died: 15 August 2024 (aged 88); Cantabria, Spain
- Education: University of Valladolid; University of Deusto
- Occupation: Banker
- Spouse(s): Belén Naveda Agüero (divorced) Adela Bermúdez
- Children: 5
- Parent(s): Emilio Botín-Sanz de Sautuola López; Ana García de los Ríos y Caller
- Relatives: Emilio Botín (brother); Ana Patricia Botín (niece)

Jaime Botín-Sanz de Sautuola y García de los Ríos (10 April 1936 – 15 August 2024) was a Spanish billionaire heir, banker and art collector.

== Early life ==
Botín was born in 1936. His father Emilio Botín (1903–1993) and elder brother Emilio Botín have been chairman of the Santander Group, and following his death in 2024, was succeeded by his daughter (Jaime's niece) Ana Patricia Botín.

He received a law degree from the University of Valladolid and an economics degree from the University of Deusto.

== Career ==
Botín was vice chairman of Santander Bank in the 1990s. He resigned in 2004.

== Personal life and death ==
Botín was married to Belén Naveda Agüero. They had five children and later divorced. He later married Adela Bermúdez. They resided in Madrid, Spain.

He was the owner of Head of a Young Woman, a painting by Pablo Picasso. He acquired the Adix yacht from Alan Bond in 1989. In January 2020 he was convicted of trafficking culturally important goods for attempting to illegally export the Picasso painting aboard the yacht, and was fined €91.7 million and sentenced to three years in prison.

Botín died in Cantabria on 15 August 2024, at the age of 88.
