= Vicente Botín =

Spanish journalist and writer

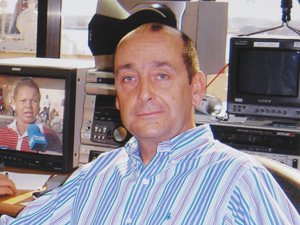
- Vicente Botín in 2008
- Born: Burgos, Spain

Vicente Botín is a Spanish writer and journalist.

== Biography ==
He was born in Burgos, Spain. He studied journalism, politics and sociology in Universidad Complutense de Madrid.

Vicente Botín started in the news media predominately about International Politics, concentrating on Latin America. In 1971 he travelled across the entire continent as an on-the-scene reporter for different broadcast Media; he was one of the first Spanish journalists, while in Chile, to interview President Salvador Allende.

In 1972 he reported for the Televisión Española (TVE) on significant events of that time in France, the United Kingdom, Turkey, Israel, Lebanon, Morocco and Zimbabwe.

Nevertheless, his major works were about Latin America: In the 60's he made documentaries in Nicaragua (Sandinismo y Contra), El Salvador (civil war), Paraguay (coup d'état against Alfredo Stroessner), Cuba (he interviewed Fidel Castro), Ecuador (amazon rainforest), Haiti (first triumph of Jean Bertrand Aristide), and Brazil, Guatemala, Peru, Chile and Honduras.

In coproduction between Televisión Española and UNHCR he film the documentary Duro oficio el exilio, about the drama of Central America refugees.

Later, he was the director of En Portada, long-running documentary program of TVE. The most representative episode was El descubrimiento de la lentitud, filmed aboard a replica of the Santa María Caravel on a voyage made in the same conditions experienced by Cristóbal Colón when he landed in the Americas. He also continued his news reporting activities from various places in the world.

From 1999 to 2004 he was the correspondent in Buenos Aires (Argentina) for Televisión Española; he reported on stories throughout South America. He made many reports and documentaries about the Argentinian crisis caused by the fall of the President Fernando de la Rúa, the deaths caused by starvation of the children of Tucumán; the various issues resulting from the trial of the dictator Augusto Pinochet, the problems in Bolivia related to the coca crop and the new Brazil president Luiz Inácio Lula da Silva.

From 2005 to 2008 he was the correspondent in Cuba for Televisión Española. He was threatened and pressured by the government while reporting which included stories on Human Rights, political opposition groups, the health of Fidel Castro and the possible turn over of government to his brother, Raúl Castro.

He also did reports for other Spanish language media radio and print.

When he finished as a correspondent in Cuba he wrote, Los funerales de Castro about the difficult situation of the Cubans and Raúl Castro: La pulga que cabalgó al tigre, a comprehensive biography of Raúl Castro.

Vicente Botín is a columnist of the Spanish newspapers El País, El Mundo and others. He lectures in Spain and the United States about the social, economical and political situation of Cuba: in Casa de América, in Madrid and Columbia University in New York, Seton Hall in New Jersey; and also for the United Nations (invited by the United Nations Correspondents Association).
