= Ó Sé =

- Pronunciation: Irish: [oː ˈʃeː]
- Language: Irish

Origin
- Origin: Ó Séaghdha
- Meaning: "of the hawk"

Other names
- Anglicisation: O'Shea

Ó Sé is a surname of Irish origin. People with name include:

- Dáithí Ó Sé, Irish television personality
- Darragh Ó Sé, Irish sportsman
- Maidhc Dainín Ó Sé, Irish language writer and musician
- Marc Ó Sé, Irish sportsman
- Mícheál Ó Sé, Irish sportsman
- Páidí Ó Sé (1955–2012), Irish footballer
- Seán Ó Sé (1936–2026), Irish tenor singer
- Tomás Ó Sé, Irish sportsman

== See also ==
- O'Shea or O Shea – common anglicisations of this Irish surname
