= Emilio Botín =

Spanish banker

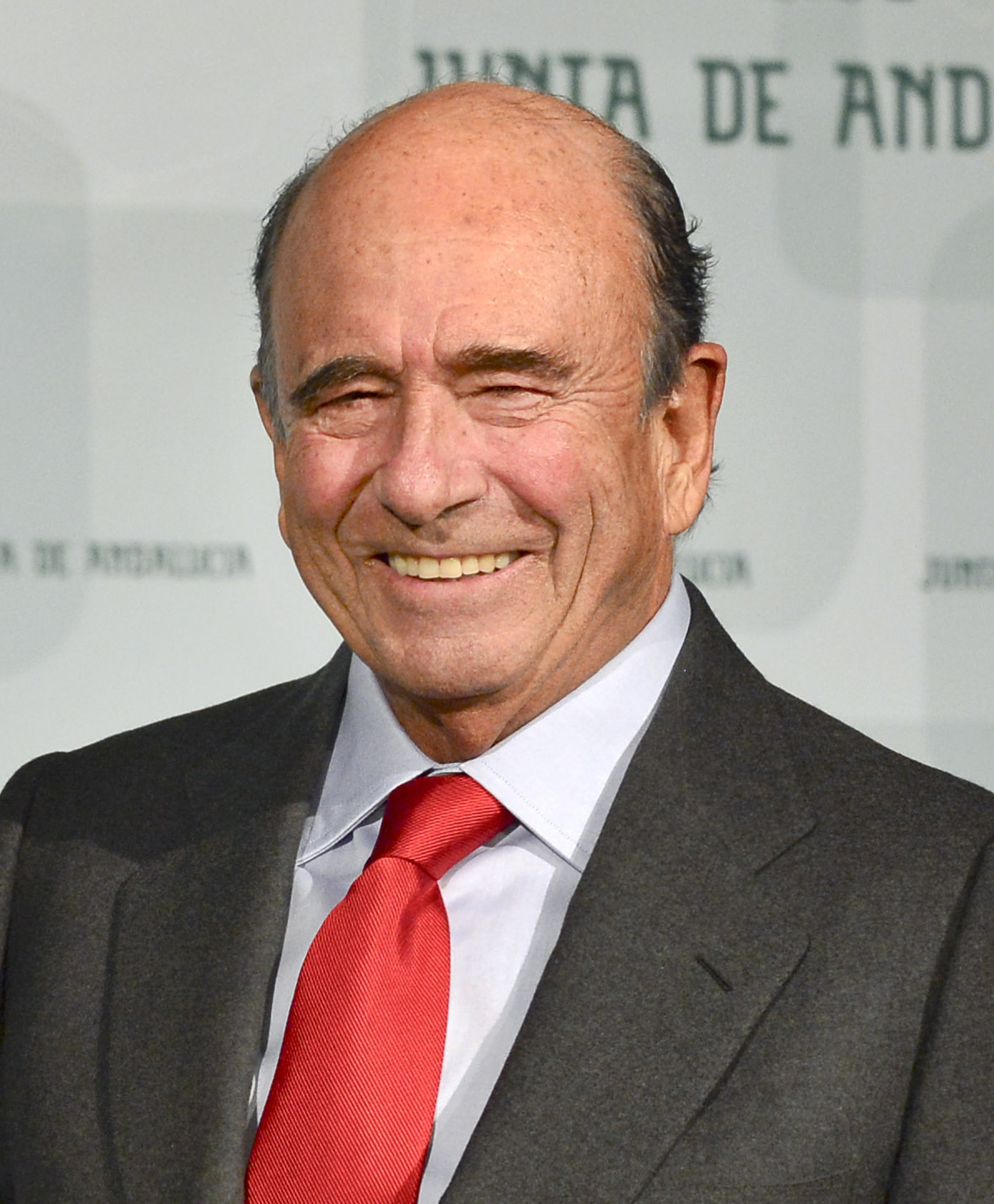
- Emilio Botín in 2010
- Born: Emilio Botín-Sanz de Sautuola y García de los Ríos; 1 October 1934; Santander, Spain
- Died: 10 September 2014 (aged 79); Madrid, Spain
- Education: University of Deusto
- Occupation: Banker
- Known for: Executive chairman of Grupo Santander
- Spouse: Paloma O'Shea, 1st Marchioness of O'Shea
- Children: 6, including Ana Patricia Botín O'Shea
- Parent(s): Emilio Botín-Sanz de Sautuola López; Ana García de los Ríos y Caller
- Relatives: Jaime Botín (brother)

Emilio Botín-Sanz de Sautuola y García de los Ríos, iure uxoris Marquess of O'Shea (1 October 1934 – 10 September 2014) was a Spanish banker. He was the executive chairman of Spain's Grupo Santander. In 1993 his bank absorbed Banco Español de Crédito (Banesto), and in 1999 it merged with Banco Central Hispano creating Banco Santander Central Hispano (BSCH), which became Spain's largest bank, of which he was co-president with Central Hispano's José María Amusategui, until Amusategui retired in 2002. In 2004, BSCH acquired the British bank Abbey National, making BSCH the second largest bank in Europe by market capitalisation. He was known for his obsession with growth and performance as well as regularly visiting branches.

== Early life ==
Botín was born in Santander, Cantabria, on the northern coast of Spain, the eldest of two sons of Emilio Botín y Sanz de Sautuola, born on 18 January 1903, and Ana María García de los Ríos y Caller. After attending as a boarding student the Jesuit school of Colegio de la Inmaculada, in Gijón, he studied law and economics at the University of Deusto in Bilbao.

== Career ==
In 1986 Botín, then aged 52, took over from his father as chairman of Santander, one of many banks that existed in Spain at the time. Botín was no newcomer to the banking world. His father, grandfather and great-grandfather were all bankers.

In 2005, Forbes put Emilio Botín's net worth at $1.7 billion. Botín's eldest daughter, Ana Patricia Botín, was the president of Banesto from 2002 to November 2010 and was the CEO of Santander UK from December 2010 until Emilio's death upon which she was elected his successor as executive chairman of Grupo Santander.

During his chairmanship, Banco Santander was named 2012 'Best bank in the world', the third time that the bank had received this award over the previous seven years.

== Secret bank accounts ==
Botín and his family held undisclosed bank accounts in Switzerland since 1937. Those accounts were discovered by the Spanish tax authorities in 2010. Botín and his family voluntarily settled the case, paying a bill of €200 million. In 2012, Spain's High Court dropped a tax evasion probe for these issues, stating that Botín and his family had satisfied Spanish tax authorities with the €200 million settlement.

== Personal life ==
Botín was married to the Marchioness of O'Shea, and they had six children. His daughter Carmen was married to golfer Seve Ballesteros from 1988 to 2004.

He died on 9 September 2014, of a heart attack in Madrid. Botín was survived by his six children and nineteen grandchildren.

Botin's eldest daughter Ana Patricia Botín, previously head of Santander's British business, was appointed chairman after his death.
