= Shai (given name) =

Shai is a Jewish given name. It is derived from the Hebrew word for 'gift' (שי).

Notable people with the name include:

- Shai Bolton (born 1998), Australian rules footballer
- Shai Buium (born 2003), American ice hockey player
- Shai Davidai, Israeli assistant professor at Columbia Business School, advocate against antisemitism
- Shai Gilgeous-Alexander (born 1998), Canadian professional basketball player
- Shai Hope (born 1993), Barbadian and West Indies cricketer and Captain of the West Indies in both One Day Internationals and T20 Internationals
- Shai Kakon (born 2002), Israeli Olympic sailor
- Shai Linne (born 1974), American Christian rapper
- Shai Reshef, Israeli businessperson and academic administrator

== See also ==
- Shai (disambiguation)
