= Red Shea (baseball) =

American baseball player (1898-1981)

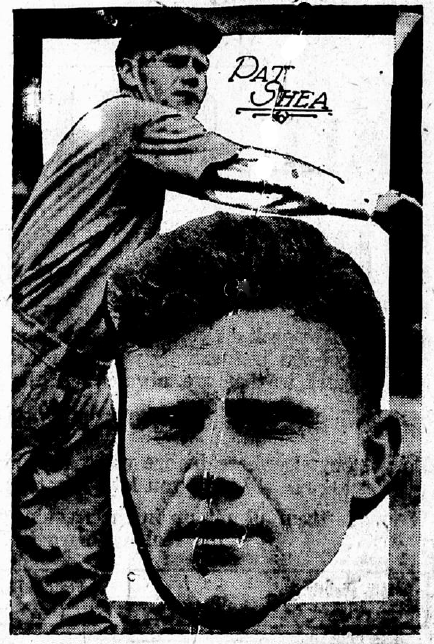
- Pitcher
- Born: November 29, 1898; Ware, Massachusetts, U.S.
- Died: November 17, 1981 (aged 82); Stafford, Connecticut, U.S.
- Batted: Right Threw: Right

MLB debut
- May 6, 1918, for the Philadelphia Athletics

Last MLB appearance
- June 9, 1922, for the New York Giants

MLB statistics
- Win–loss record: 5–5
- Earned run average: 3.80
- Strikeouts: 17
- Stats at Baseball Reference

Teams
- Philadelphia Athletics (1918); New York Giants (1921–1922)

Patrick Henry "Red" Shea (November 29, 1898 – November 17, 1981) was an American Major League Baseball pitcher who played in 1918 with the Philadelphia Athletics, and 1921 and 1922 with the New York Giants.
